= List of online video platforms =

Online video platforms allow users to upload, share videos or live stream their own videos to the Internet. These can either be for the general public to watch, or particular users on a shared network. The most popular video hosting website is YouTube, 2 billion active since October 2020 and the most extensive catalog of online videos. There are some countries in the world placing restrictions on YouTube, instead having their own regional video-sharing websites in its place. Other popular video platforms include TikTok, Bilibili, and Twitch.

== Notable examples ==
=== Specifically dedicated video-hosting websites ===
Similarweb global rankings as of 4 February 2025
Name	Language	Traffic rank
56.com	Mandarin	97,484
AcFun	Mandarin	8,706
Aparat	Persian	4,772
Bigo	English	23,694
Bilibili	Multilingual / Mandarin	22 (.com) / 609 (.tv)
BitChute	English	6,262
Dailymotion	Multilingual	200
DLive	Multilingual	29,498
DTube	Multilingual	263,800
FC2 Video	Multilingual	216
Gan Jing World	Multilingual	61,721
Godtube	English	127,622
iQIYI	Mandarin	1,925
Niconico	Japanese	270
Nebula	English	26,008
Odysee	Multilingual	7,039
Rumble	English	1,222
Rutube (formerly Pladform)	Russian	1,227,284
SchoolTube	English	254,261
Tudou	Mandarin	168,170
TikTok / Douyin	Multilingual / Mandarin	15 / 96
Vimeo	Multilingual	1,092
Youku	Mandarin / Multilingual	1,938 (.com) / 42,468 (.tv)
YouTube	Multilingual	2

Predominantly live-streaming video platforms
Name	Language	Similarweb traffic rank
Kick	Multilingual	485
Twitch	Multilingual	36
YouNow	Multilingual	101,935

=== Websites dedicated to adult (pornographic) video ===
Similarweb global rankings 4 February 2025
Name	Language	Traffic rank	In adult category
Eporner	40	8	
ManyVids	1,819	202	
OnlyFans	116	15	
Pornhub	16	1	
RedTube	316	44	
PornMD	6,987	696	
XNXX	39	3	
XHamster	N/A	N/A	
XVideos	17	2	
YouPorn	175	27	

Live webcam modeling performance platforms
Name	Language	Traffic rank	In adult category
BongaCams	Multilingual	637	88
Cam4	Multilingual	766	102
CamSoda	Multilingual	2,833	298
Chaturbate	Multilingual	38	7
LiveJasmin	Multilingual	187	30
MyFreeCams	Multilingual	1,581	187
Stripchat	Multilingual	37	6

=== Broader websites which allow the hosting of videos ===
Similarweb global rankings as of 28 June 2023
Name	Language	Traffic rank
Facebook / Instagram	Multilingual	3 / 4
Flickr / SmugMug	Multilingual	476 / 4,273
Internet Archive	Multilingual	179
Myspace	Multilingual	26,911
Newgrounds	English	3,453
Odnoklassniki	Russian	79
Photobucket	Multilingual	25,763
Rediff	Multilingual	837
Tencent Video & QQ / WeTV	Mandarin / Multilingual	93 / 6,636
Tumblr	Multilingual	220
VK	Multilingual	25
Weibo	Mandarin	204
Wikimedia Commons	Multilingual	737
X / Twitter	Multilingual	5 / 78

=== Discontinued ===
Hoster	Language	Country	Notes
Blip.tv	English	United States	Service ran from May 2005 to August 2015. Acquired by Maker Studios in August 2013.
Google Video	English	United States	Service ran from January 2005 to August 2012. The website has been repurposed to serve as Google's video search engine.
HD share	English	United States	Service ran from July 2008 to 2011. Focused on HD videos. Acquired by United Social Networks LLC in 2011.
iFilm	English	United States	Service ran from 1997 to 2008.
Justin.tv	Multilingual	United States	Service ran from March 2007. Acquired by Twitch Interactive in March 2014. In August 2014, Justin.tv was officially shut down so that the company could focus on Twitch.
LiveLeak	Multilingual	United Kingdom	Service ran from October 2006 to May 2021.
MaYoMo	11 languages	The Netherlands	Service ran from October 2009 to 2013.
Megavideo	Cantonese & English	Hong Kong	Service ran from March 2005 to January 2012. It got seized by the FBI for Copyright infringement on January 19, 2012.
Metacafe	Multilingual	Israel	Service ran from July 2003 to August 2021
Mevio	English	United States	Service ran from October 2004 to May 2014.
Mixer	Multilingual	United States	Service ran from January 2016 to July 2020.
MUZU.TV	English	Ireland	Service ran from July 2008 to October 2015. Music videos only.
MyVideo	German	Romania → Germany	Service ran from 2006 to April 2016.
Ogelle	English	Nigeria	Service ran from April 2019, to 2022.
Openfilm	Multilingual	United States	Service ran from June 2008 to August 2015.
Periscope	English	United States	Service ran from March 2015 to March 2021.
Pixorial	English	United States	Service ran from 2009 to July 2014. Acquired by LifeLogger Technologies Corp. in 2016.
Redlasso	English	United States	Service ran from June 2005 to July 2008. Site returned as a licensed provider for Fox TV content, then turned into a typical news portal site.
Revver	English	United States	Service ran from October 2005 to 2011. Acquired by LiveUniverse in 2008.
Sevenload	12 languages	Germany	Service ran from April 2006 to April 2014.
Smashcast	Multilingual	United States	Service ran from the merger of Azubu and Hitbox in May 2017, until November 2020.
Trilulilu	Romanian	Romania	Service ran from January 2007 until July 2020.
TroopTube	English	United States	Service ran from at least 2008 to July 2011 as part of the US DoD communications program Military OneSource.
Tune.pk	Urdu	Pakistan	Service ran from January 2012 to 2020.
V Live	Korean	South Korea	Service ran from 2015 to 2022 and transferred to Weverse Company on March 2, 2022. It was shut down after merging with Weverse on December 31, 2022
Veoh	English	Japan	Service ran from September 2005 to November 2024; videos and content transferred to FC2 Video.
Vessel	English	United States	Service ran from January 2015 to October 2016. Acquired by Verizon in October 2016.
Vevo	English	United States	Service ran from December 2009 to May 2018. The company website is still available, but its content is now consolidated on YouTube only.
Videolog	Portuguese	Brazil	Service ran from May 2004 to January 2015.
Vidme	English	United States	Service ran from January 2014 to December 2017.
Vine	25 languages	United States	Service ran from January 2013 to January 2017.
Xtube	Multilingual	Canada	Service ran from March 2006 to September 2021.

== White-label providers ==
White-label providers sell the technology to various parties that allow them to create the services of the aforementioned user-generated video-sharing websites with the client's brand. Just as Akamai and other companies host and manage video/image/audio for many companies, these white-labels host video content. A few of these companies also offer their own user-generated video sharing website both for commercial purposes and to show off their platform. Websites in this category include or have included:

- Dailymotion Cloud
- VHX, which was absorbed by Vimeo in 2018

== Enterprise providers ==
Listed here are video hosting providers exclusively serving businesses wanting to share video content internally with employees or externally with customers, partners, or prospects. Features may include limiting access to authenticated users, tracking of user actions, integration with single sign-on services, and a lack of the advertisements normally present on public sites. Among sites in this category are:

- Brightcove
- Dacast
- Dailymotion Cloud
- JW Player
- Kaltura
- Kewego
- MediaCore
- MetaCDN
- Microsoft Stream
- Ooyala
- Panopto
- Qumu
- Rumble
- ThePlatform
- IBM Cloud Video
- ViaStreaming
- Viddler

== Open source ==
- MediaGoblin (software)
- PeerTube
- Plumi (software to create video-sharing sites)

== Web-based video editing ==
Web-based video-editing sites generally offer a user-generated video sharing website in addition to some form of editing application. Some of these apps simply allow the user to crop a video into a smaller clip. Other services have invested much time and effort into replicating the same functionality that has previously only been available via client-side desktop applications that run outside of a web page. Today, most of these apps are AJAX-based (formerly many used Flash before it was slowly abandoned over security issues. Some of these websites may additionally offer downloadable editors; however, this is not a desktop- but a web-based video editor list. Websites in this category include:

- Animoto
- Clesh
- Dailymotion
- Blackbird
- Jaycut (no longer available for PC)
- Magisto
- Pixorial
- WeVideo
- Tribute

== See also ==
- Comparison of video hosting services
- List of educational video websites
- Online video platform

== Notes ==
- The Similarweb listings cited in detail below, which include only the top 300 sites per category, were used with their internal "Search" feature to find all of the sites listed here and get more specific statistics at per-site analytics pages. Where individual websites' specific pages provided different statistics from the initial list, the former have been used here, as they appear to be updated more frequently, based on more criteria, and inclusive of global, all-industry totals. Some of these ranking statistics may still be a bit inaccurate, due to the number of sites that provided dedicated mobile apps, which may pull content from cloud servers with just IP addresses of cloud-service domain names, and so do not contribute to the web-traffic analysis of the specific video service provider domain name being tracked by Similarweb.
