= BongaCams =

Adult website

- Website type: Adult camming website
- Available in: Multilingual (34)
- Headquarters: Paris, Nicosia, Amsterdam, France, Netherlands, Czech Republic
- Country of origin: France, Netherlands, Cyprus, Russia.
- Area served: Worldwide, except blocking countries
- Industry: Internet
- Website: bongacams.com
- Advertising: Yes
- Launched: 25 January 2012; 14 years ago
- Current status: Active

BongaCams is a live streaming platform that features content made by webcam models, couples, and camboys. Typical shows include erotic performances that generally involve nudity and provocative yet engaging activities for the viewers; ranging from teasing, stripping, erotic chatting to masturbation with sex toys. All site visitors are able to join online chat rooms, while models earn money by hosting private shows and getting tips from registered users.

Currently, BongaCams is one of the largest adult live streaming platforms in Europe and is ranked as 37th most popular website in the world by Alexa (December 2021). On a global scale, the platform competes with the U.S based platform Chaturbate.

== History ==
The domain was registered in 2012.

The website received its first award in 2016 - becoming Best Emerging Live Cam Site at Live Cam Awards 2016.

In December 2016, BongaCams acquired RusCams.com.

In March 2017, they acquired another camming site CamFuze.com.

In January 2017, Maltese newspaper The Malta Independent reported that BongaCams was more popular among the Maltese than Wikipedia.

In December 2017, BongaCams acquired a popular webcam site Runetki.com.

In July 2018, Runet's most popular website smotri.com became a part of BongaCams.

In 2018, BongaCams has launched the Mobile App for models for Android and iOS.

In 2019, BongaCams was recognized as the Best Cam Site at the prestige Venus Awards.

During the 2020 became the most visited webcam site in the world, according to Alexa Global Ranking.

By October 2021, BongaCams won a total of 44 awards.

== Awards and nominations ==
List of awards received by BongaCams
Awards & nominations
Award	Won	Nominated
XBIZ Awards	1	2
XBIZ Cam Awards	0	1
YNOT Awards	8	4
LALEXPO Awards	6	0
AW Awards	8	0
LIVE CAM Awards	10	0
ADULT WEBCAM Awards	8	0
- Total number of wins and nominations
Totals	44	7
- References

XBIZ Awards
Year	Result	Award
2017	Nominated	Live Cam Company of the Year — Europe
2017	Nominated	Adult Site of the Year — Live Cam (Europe)
2019	Won	Cam Company of the Year

XBIZ EUROPA AWARDS
Year	Result	Award
2019	Won	Сam Site of the Year

XBIZ Cam Awards
Year	Result	Award
2017	Nominated	Best Cam Site — Europe

YNOT Awards
Year	Result	Award
2016	Won	Best Live Cam Revenue Program (EU)
2017	Nominated	Best Cam Platform (EU)
2017	Nominated	Best White Label Provider
2017	Nominated	Best Marketing Campaign
2017	Nominated	Best Live Cam Revenue Program (EU)
2017	Won	Company of the Year
2019	Won	Best Cam Platform (EU)
2019	Won	Innovative company of the year
2020	Won	Best Webcam Company of the Year
2020	Won	Best Marketing Campaign
2021	Won	Best Freemium Site
2021	Won	Best Internet Brand

LALEXPO Awards
Year	Result	Award
2016	Won	Best European Cam Site
2017	Won	Best Tipping Cam Site
2019	Won	Best Tipping Cam Site
2019	Won	Best Affiliate Program
2020	Won	Best Tipping Cam Site
2020	Won	Best International Cam Site

AW Awards
Year	Result	Award
2016	Won	Best Affiliate Program
2017	Won	Live Cam Affiliate Program of the Year
2017	Won	Freemium Cam Site of the Year
2018	Won	Freemium Camsite of the Year
2018	Won	Best White Label Provider
2019	Won	Best Business Services
2021	Won	Best Freemium Site
2021	Won	Best Internet Brand

Live Cam Awards
Year	Result	Award
2016	Won	Best Emerging Live Cam Site
2017	Won	Best Live Cam WhiteLabel Program
2017	Won	Best Live Cam Affiliate Program
2018	Won	Most Innovative Live Cam Site
2018	Won	Best Live Cam Affiliate Tool
2019	Won	Most Innovative Live Cam Site
2019	Won	Best Live Cam Affiliate Program
2020	Won	Best European Cam Site
2020	Won	Best Live Cam Affiliate Program
2021	Won	Best Overall Live Cam Site

Venus Berlin
Year	Result	Award
2019	Won	Best Cam Site

Erofest Awards
Year	Result	Award
2019	Won	Best Cam Site

Adult Webcam Awards
Year	Result	Award
2017	Won	Best Credits or Tokens Cam Site
2017	Won	Best Russian Adult Webcams Site
2018	Won	Best White Label Adult Webcams
2018	Won	Best European Adult Webcams Site
2018	Won	Best Russian Adult Webcams Site
2019	Won	Best White Label Adult Webcams
2019	Won	Best European Adult Webcams Site
2019	Won	Best Russian Adult Webcams Site

== See also ==
- Internet pornography
- List of chat websites
- List of video hosting services
- List of most popular websites
- LiveJasmin
- Chaturbate
- MyFreeCams
- Stripchat
- ManyVids
- Porn 2.0
