= LiveJasmin =

Adult live-streaming website

- Screenshot LiveJasmin homepage
- Website type: Adult camming website
- Available in: Multilingual (19)
- Headquarters: Luxembourg
- Area served: Worldwide, except blocking countries
- Owner: JWS Americas S.à r.l.
- Industry: Adult camming
- Parent: Duodecad IT Services (part of Docler Holding)
- Website: www.livejasmin.com
- Advertising: Yes
- Registration: Optional
- Launched: 12 November 2001; 24 years ago (as Jasmin.hu)
- Current status: Active

LiveJasmin (company name: JWS Americas S.à r.l.) is an adult website that provides live streaming and related services, typically featuring nudity and sexual activity ranging from striptease and erotic talk to masturbation with sex toys and full sexual intercourse.

According to Alexa rankings, it is one of the most popular sex webcam sites in the world. LiveJasmin's infrastructure, developers and other staff are based in Hungary and, from 2013, Luxembourg.

== History ==
LiveJasmin was founded in 2001 by György Gattyán in Hungary. LiveJasmin built its infrastructure and generated content in the beginning by financing studios who were mostly operating illegally in Hungary at that time.

In 2014, LiveJasmin started to advertise, producing a number of TV commercials. Two of their commercials were submitted to air during the 66th Primetime Emmys but were declined by CBS.

== Business model ==
Customers, webcam models and third parties such as studios register with the website. The payout percentage to the model ranges between 30% and 80% depending on the income of the model. Most models are from Romania, Ukraine, Russia, the Philippines, South Africa, and Colombia, while most customers are from the United States and Germany. In the Philippines, Eastern Europe, and Colombia, the models typically work for a studio that provides them with the necessary equipment and infrastructure and controls their work.

In countries where sex webcamming is illegal, such as Uganda, the platform has the studios and models assume the legal risks.

== Awards and nominations ==
List of accolades received by LiveJasmin
Awards & nominations
Award	Won	Nominated
AVN Awards	1	4
Venus Awards	1	0
XBIZ Awards	5	6
YNOT Awards	1	0
- Total number of wins and nominations
Totals	37	10
- References

=== AVN Awards ===
Year	Result	Award
2011	Nominated	Best Live Chat Website
2012	Nominated	Best Live Chat Website
2013	Won	Best Live Chat Website
2014	Nominated	Best Live Chat Website
2015	Nominated	Best Live Chat Website

=== Venus Awards ===
Year	Result	Award
2013	Won	Best Live Cam Site (International)
2023	Won	Best Premium Cam Site
2024	Won	Best Premium Cam Site

=== XBIZ Awards ===
Year	Result	Award
2007	Nominated	Live Video Chat of the Year
2009	Nominated	Live Video Chat of the Year
2010	Won	Live Video Chat of the Year
2011	Nominated	Live Cam Site of the Year
2012	Nominated	Live Cam Site of the Year
2013	Nominated	Live Cam Site of the Year
2013	Won	Mobile Site of the Year
2014	Won	Live Cam Site of the Year
2014	Won	Mobile Site of the Year
2015	Nominated	Adult Site of the Year - Live Cam
2016	Won	Adult Site of the Year — Live Cam (Europe)
2017	Won	Adult Site of the Year — Live Cam (Europe)
2018	Won	Cam Site of the Year — Europe

== See also ==
- BongaCams
- Chaturbate
- Internet pornography
- List of chat websites
- List of most-visited websites
- List of video hosting services
- MyFreeCams
- Porn 2.0
- Pornography in Hungary
- Stripchat
- Flirt4Free
