= ManyVids =

Canadian adult entertainment technology company

- Company type: Private
- Website type: Adult Content
- Available in: English
- Headquarters: Montreal, Canada
- Area served: Worldwide
- Owners: Bella French, CEO
- Industry: Technology, Adult Content
- Services: Video hosting service, live Streaming
- Website: manyvids.com
- Advertising: No
- Registration: Optional
- Launched: 2014; 12 years ago
- Current status: Online

ManyVids is a Canadian adult entertainment video hosting, live streaming, and e-commerce company headquartered in Montreal, Quebec, Canada.

== History ==
ManyVids was co-founded in 2014 by former CEO Bella French, a former webcam model and adult online content creator. French also held the title of chief financial officer until 2017. The ManyVids office is located in Montreal, Quebec, Canada. No adult content is filmed in the ManyVids office.

ManyVids publishes MV Mag, an adult magazine that showcases professional erotic photosets, interviews with celebrities, adult entertainers and content-creators, and fantasy stories. The magazine is free for site members and content creators. The ManyVids YouTube series has mainstream, original content that is safe for work, which is often comic.

In late 2025, French announced that she had shifted from a supportive to an abolitionist stance on sex work, stating her new goal would be to "transition one million people out of the adult industry" and prevent any new entrants. This came along with a shift on messaging on the site's social media and internal newsfeed from largely promotional content to AI-generated text and images about metaphysics, extraterrestrial life and numerology. Several adult creators on the platform criticized the posts as "bizarre" and expressed concern that they would be forced off the platform.

== Business model ==
ManyVids' allows adult entertainment content creators to produce, promote, and distribute their own content while retaining full copyright to their work. They are able to upload videos and pictures for members to purchase and download. They can also run an online shop and offer paid memberships. Members are able to leave tips and unlock special statuses while interacting with the content-creators in real time.

Depending on the type of content, ManyVids takes a 20% or 40% cut of creator profits.

== Celebrity partnerships ==
The MV Podcast is a live show starring trans comedian Tranna, which has run for a total of three seasons. The show is based on hour long interviews with camgirls and pornstars that allow insight into the lives of sex-workers.

In September 2017, ManyVids teamed up with American model and activist Amber Rose in support of The Amber Rose SlutWalk, a nonprofit advocacy organization that works to end slut-shaming and to advocate for women’s empowerment and LGBTQ rights. Rose was the first celebrity to appear live on the MV Takeover platform.

In November 2017, ManyVids named American television personality Farrah Abraham their newest MV Ambassador to promote sex positivity.

In May 2018, ManyVids partnered with actress, model, and reality television participant Coco Austin on a live MV Takeover event in addition to exclusive photo sets and interviews appearing in MV Magazine.

In September 2018, ManyVids featured American rapper Brooke Candy on the cover of their magazine's Sexual Empowerment issue. ManyVids sponsored Candy's 'My Sex' music video.

== Campaigns and philanthropy ==
In November 2017, ManyVids launched the We Are Many campaign to help raise awareness of the issue of abuse against sex workers. The campaign culminated with a donation of US$11,800 to the Sex Workers Outreach Project-USA to help them end violence against sex workers.

In December 2017, ManyVids donated US$5,000 to the Association of Sites Advocating Child Protection to demonstrate the adult industry's commitment to helping parents prevent children from viewing age-inappropriate content.

== Industry recognition ==
In 2018, ManyVids was nominated for 3 XBIZ Awards: Progressive Web Company of the Year, Emerging Web Brand of the Year and Clip Site of the Year. They won the award for Clip Site of the Year; two of the company’s founders were on hand to accept the award.

In 2019, ManyVids was recognised as the Global Web Brand of the Year at the XBIZ Europa Awards.

In 2022, ManyVids won the XBIZ Award for "Creator Platform of the Year".

== See also ==
- Internet pornography
- List of chat websites
- List of most popular websites
- List of video hosting services
- OnlyFans
- Porn 2.0
