= Flirt4Free =

Adult live webcam website

- Website type: Webcam site, Adult entertainment
- Available in: English
- Owners: VS Media, Inc.
- Industry: Adult entertainment
- Website: flirt4free.com
- Commercial: Yes
- Launched: 1996; 30 years ago (as VideoSecrets); 2003 (as Flirt4Free)
- Current status: Active

Flirt4Free is an adult live webcam platform operated by VS Media, Inc. Originally launched in 1996 under the name VideoSecrets, the platform is among the earliest live webcam services established on the internet.

The website hosts live video broadcasts, allowing users to interact with performers through text chat and paid private sessions utilizing a virtual credit system.

== History and technology ==
During the early development of online live streaming in the 1990s, users accessing the service were required to install proprietary software to view broadcasts. By 1998, the platform had transitioned its infrastructure to support direct browser-based streaming. The service officially rebranded to Flirt4Free in 2003.

As interactive webcam technologies evolved, the platform integrated long-distance hardware capabilities. In 2015, Flirt4Free partnered with interactive device manufacturers Kiiroo and Interactive Life Forms to host early live teledildonic broadcasts, allowing users with WiFi-enabled haptic devices to physically interact with performers during live streams.

In 2018, Engadget highlighted the site's continued implementation of teledildonics.

A 2017 report recognized Flirt4Free as one of the top five most-trafficked adult websites, noting its transition to HTTPS and SSL encryption to protect user privacy.

Over its history, the company has expanded by acquiring several other adult webcam properties, including Camster.com, Naked.com, and CamDolls.com.

== Corporate affairs ==
Flirt4Free's parent company, VS Media, Inc., has maintained control of the platform's digital presence through legal arbitration. In 2019, the World Intellectual Property Organization (WIPO) ruled in favor of VS Media in a domain name dispute, legally affirming the company's long-term rights to the Flirt4Free web address. In 2017, VS Media donated the Gay.com domain name to the Los Angeles LGBT Center.

== Awards ==
Flirt4Free has received multiple adult industry awards. The platform has won multiple XBIZ Awards, including 'Live Video Chat of the Year', 'Affiliate Program of the Year', and 'Cam Site of the Year – Gay'.

It has also been awarded at the YNOT Awards, winning 'Best Cam Site' and 'Best Adult Internet Brand', and has received several Cybersocket Web Awards for 'Best Live Cam Site'.

The site was additionally awarded 'Best Live Cam' at the 2015 Grabby Awards.

== See also ==
- Chaturbate
- LiveJasmin
- MyFreeCams
- Bang Bros
