= Chaturbate =

Pornographic live streaming website

- Available in: Multilingual (15)
- Founded: 2011; 15 years ago
- Headquarters: Irvine, California, U.S.
- Area served: Worldwide, except blocking countries
- Owner: Multi Media LLC
- Industry: Pornographic camming
- Website: chaturbate.com
- Advertising: Yes
- Registration: Optional
- Launched: February 26, 2011; 15 years ago
- Current status: Active

Chaturbate (sometimes referred to as "CB") is a pornographic website providing live-streamed webcam performances by individual webcam models and couples, typically featuring nudity and sexual activity ranging from striptease and erotic talk to more explicit sexual acts such as masturbation with sex toys.

As of April 2025, Chaturbate was the 40th most popular website in the world and the fourth most popular pornographic site.

== Concept ==
"Chaturbate" is a portmanteau of "chat" and "masturbate". Viewers are allowed to watch for free (with the exception of private shows) but pay money in the form of "tips" in order to see certain sex acts performed.

Models can synchronize remote-controlled vibrators and other sex toys so that they can be activated when "tipped" and the frequencies affected by the amount of "tips" given, with the intention of "users paying to try to give [the models] an orgasm".

Models need not be humans, as is the case with Projekt Melody, an artificial intelligence "cam girl", who has about 20,000 followers. However, Chaturbate did require the operator to prove their age.

The site itself earns revenues by taking roughly 40% to 50% from the models' earnings. Chaturbate generates revenue from the audience when they purchase tokens using their credit cards. Each Chaturbate token is worth $0.05 to a model and they need to earn at least $50.00 to receive the payment. However, when purchased by viewers, tokens cost about $0.10, depending on the amount bought in a single transaction.

== Rankings ==
As of November 2019, the site was ranked 22nd in the Alexa global rank and was the largest adult camming site competing with European BongaCams and LiveJasmin, which represented an increase from 167th globally and third in adult websites, trailing Xvideos and Livejasmin, in February 2017. In 2018, the top five countries that their users resided in were 20.5% from the United States, followed by 8.5% from Germany, 6.8% from Japan, 6.2% from the United Kingdom and 4.7% from China.

It is estimated that the site receives about 117 million monthly visits, which translates to approximately 4.1 million unique visitors each month, and an estimated 780,000 a day.

== Sponsorships ==
Chaturbate was the presenting sponsor for the 33rd AVN Awards in 2016, as well as an exhibitor at the AVN Adult Entertainment Expo that year and in 2017. In 2020, the site partnered with independent Canadian filmmakers Ethan Cole and Daniel AM Rosenberg to produce Cam_Girlfriend, a 10-episode web series broadcast on YouTube.

== Lawsuits ==
In March 2024, Chaturbate was sued by Texas Attorney General Ken Paxton, who alleged that the site was failing to comply with a Texas age verification law. As a result of the lawsuit, the site put in place an online age verification system, and in April 2024 Chaturbate agreed to pay $675,000 to the state of Texas as part of a settlement.

In July 2025, a proposed class action lawsuit against Chaturbate was filed by a former content moderator for the site, who alleged that he suffered psychological trauma after being exposed to "extreme, violent, graphic, and sexually explicit content" on a daily basis and that the site "knowingly and intentionally failed to provide their content moderators with industry-standard mental health protections."

== See also ==
- Chat room
- Internet pornography
- List of chat websites
- List of most popular websites
- Porn 2.0

== Studies about Chaturbate ==
- Bartlett, Jamie (2016). The Dark Net: Inside the Digital Underworld. Brooklyn, NY: Melville House. ISBN 9781612195216.
- Witt, Emily (2016). Future sex. New York, NY: Farrar, Straus and Giroux. ISBN 9780865478800.
- van Doorn, Niels; Velthuis, Olav (2018). "A good hustle: the moral economy of market competition in adult webcam modeling". Journal of Cultural Economy. 11 (3). Routledge: 177–192. doi:10.1080/17530350.2018.1446183. hdl:11245.1/3f0aa5dd-ef96-41ee-9c4d-aad7c1c07064.
- Martins, Eduardo E. B. (October 2019). "I'm the Operator With My Pocket Vibrator: Collective Intimate Relations on Chaturbate". Social Media + Society. 5 (4). doi:10.1177/2056305119879989.
- Hernández, Antonia (October 2019). ""There's something compelling about real life": Technologies of security and acceleration on Chaturbate". Social Media + Society. 5 (4). doi:10.1177/2056305119894000.
- Theunissen, Eva; Favero, Paolo Silvio Harald (April 2021). "Veiling the image/framing the body: The labour of enduring ephemerals in the context of trans* male adult camming practices on Chaturbate". New Media & Society. 23 (4): 780–795. doi:10.1177/1461444820954189.
