= LittleRedBunny =

American pornographic actress

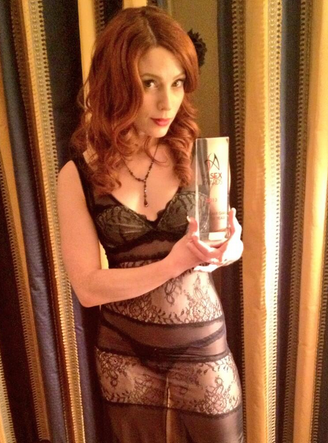
- Born: December 9, 1988 (age 37)
- Other name: Ophelia Marcus
- Occupation: Webcam Model
- Website: www.littleredbunny.com

Ophelia Marcus, better known as LittleRedBunny, is an American Webcam Model. In 2015, she was described by The Daily Beast as "The Queen of Cam Girls".

== Career ==
LittleRedBunny describes herself as a lifetime New Yorker. She entered the business of webcam adult entertainment "after she lost a straight job and was looking for something different." Utilizing her background in classical ballet and yoga to perform on the Internet, she began developing her own style of webcam performance. Since 2009, she has been working in the adult entertainment industry on the LiveJasmin website. She earns her income by selling private, one-on-one webcam sessions to fans. She says that she has held private webcam sessions that have lasted up to 19 hours.

LittleRedBunny received a "Best Webcam Girl" award at the 2013 Sex Awards and the "Favorite Webcam Girl" award at the 2014 AVN Awards.

In August 2014, LittleRedBunny headlined the inaugural Camming Con at Miami Beach, Florida's Eden Roc Hotel. LittleRedBunny has been noted for having "one of the highest profiles among adult webcam models".

In 2015, LittleRedBunny was interviewed for an article by CNBC regarding the growing number of webcam models working in Romania and Colombia. The article also examined some of the differences between US practices and those in other countries. "'Because we all live in different places, we don’t all work the same hours, which is a good thing', [LittleRedbunny] said. 'I have a feeling that the behavior is slightly different as well. There are a number of girls who will type rather than talk, so that gives me something that works better for me.'"

LittleRedBunny established the first webcam model academy in 2017 with her LittleRedAcademy and "launched the industry's first global Comprehensive Webcam survey" aimed at models and studios in 2019. She also established her philosophy of camming, called "Camology and the Art of Camming" in 2016. It is a philosophy that calls for an individualized approach of mentoring for each performer rather than a one-size-fits-all concept.

In 2017, LittleRedBunny starred in and was the executive producer of the web series WankBank. "The comedic web series follows Mika, a young man who is forced to attend court-mandated 'masturbators anonymous' to avoid jail time and becoming a registered sex offender, only to discover the group is more trouble than what he thought he avoided. LittleRedBunny will play Mika’s troublemaking subconscious and his favorite adult entertainer".

LittleRedBunny was recognized by Entertainment Tonight as having one of, "The Most Revealing Red Carpet Looks of All Time." She came in 51st out of 77 celebrities recognized for this distinction. Entertainment Tonight updated this list in September 2021. Once again, LittleRedBunny made the scene coming in 57th of 82 celebrities chosen for their daring red carpet fashion statements.

LittleRedBunny co-hosted the following awards shows: The AW Awards in 2015, The YNOT Awards in 2017 with Jay Kopita, and the Live Cam Awards in 2018.

While featuring her in their magazine in 2018, CamLife Magazine honored LittleRedbunny by naming her their "Icon of the Year." CamLife Magazine also awarded her their Pioneer of the Year award for 2020.

In 2019, LittleRedBunny was featured in "A Cam Life Documentary" a digital exclusive interview for HULU. " Little Red Bunny discusses life as a live webcam performer. An exclusive bonus feature interview from 'A Cam Life' Documentary filmed at the AW Summit in Mamaia, Romania."

In early June, 2021, CamLife Magazine recognized LittleRedBunny as the 8th most influential member of the camming community. "LittleRedBunny AKA the Queen of Cam. LittleRedBunny is the phenom of the live cam community. She is constantly one of cams top earners with record-breaking cam sessions lasting over 20 plus hrs. LittleRedBunny has been recognized for her work with multiple awards wins. She has been featured in both adult and mainstream publications including the cover of CamLife." In March, 2022, Cam Life Magazine again recognized LittleRedBunny as a top influencer, rating her 12th of the top 50 influencers of the industry. "LittleRedBunny AKA the Queen of Cam. LittleRedBunny is the phenom of the live cam community. She is constantly one of cams top earners with record-breaking cam sessions lasting over 20 plus hrs. LittleRedBunny has been recognized for her work with multiple awards wins. She has been featured in both adult and mainstream publications including the cover of CamLife."

LittleRedBunny writes a monthly column for YNOT.com entitled "Dialogues of Camming: Deeper than the Tip." The column offers advice and insights for webcam models and gives them an opportunity to express their experiences, points of view, and opinions on a variety of topics in the industry. The column also provides an opportunity to learn about being a cam model and the creative and practical processes involved.

== Awards and nominations ==
| Year | Ceremony | Result | Category |
|---|---|---|---|
| 2013 | Sex Awards | Won | Best WebCam Girl |
| 2014 | AVN Award | Won | Favorite WebCam Girl |
| 2015 | Live Cam Awards | Won | Best Female Live Cam Model |
| 2015 | Live Cam Awards | Won | Jasmin Honorary Award |
| 2015 | AVN Award | Nominated | Favorite WebCam Girl |
| 2015 | AVN Award | Nominated | Best Solo Girl Website |
| 2015 | AW Award | Won | Cam Model of the Year |
| 2016 | AVN Award | Nominated | Biggest Web Celebrity |
| 2016 | AVN Award | Nominated | Best Solo Girl Website |
| 2016 | Adult WebCam Awards | Won | 2016 Hall of Fame (Performer) |
| 2016 | Live Cam Awards | Won | Best Personal Website |
| 2016 | LaLExpo Awards | Won | Best Cam or Solo Model Site |
| 2017 | Live Cam Awards | Won | Best Personal Website |
| 2017 | AVN Awards | Nominated | Favorite Cam Girl |
| 2017 | Bucharest Summit | Won | Independent Model of the Year |
| 2017 | AW Awards | Won | Diamond Award |
| 2017 | YNOT Awards | Won | Best Live Cam Model (Independent) |
| 2018 | Live Cam Awards | Won | Live Cam Celebrity of the Year |
| 2018 | AW Exec Awards | Won | Divatraffic Appreciation Award |
| 2018 | YNOT Awards | Won | Most Playful Model |
| 2019 | Live Cam Awards | Won | Best Model Brand |
| 2019 | AW Awards | Won | North American Model of the Year |
| 2020 | Live Cam Awards | Won | Live Cam Celebrity of the Year |
| 2020 | YNOT Awards | Won | Live Cam Celebrity of the Year |
| 2020 | CamLife Awards | Won | CamLife Pioneer of the Year |
| 2021 | Live Cam Awards | Won | Live Cam Celebrity of the Year |
| 2022 | Live Cam Awards | Won | Best Live Cam Model Brand |
| 2022 | Bucharest Summit Awards | Won | North American Cam Model of the Year |
| 2023 | Live Cam Awards | Won | Best Independent Cam Model |
| 2023 | Bucharest Summit Awards | Won | North American Cam Model of the Year |
| 2024 | Live Cam Awards | Won | Celebrity of the Year |
| 2024 | Bucharest Summit Awards | Won | Outstanding Achievement Recognition Award |
