= Webcam model =

Livestream video performer

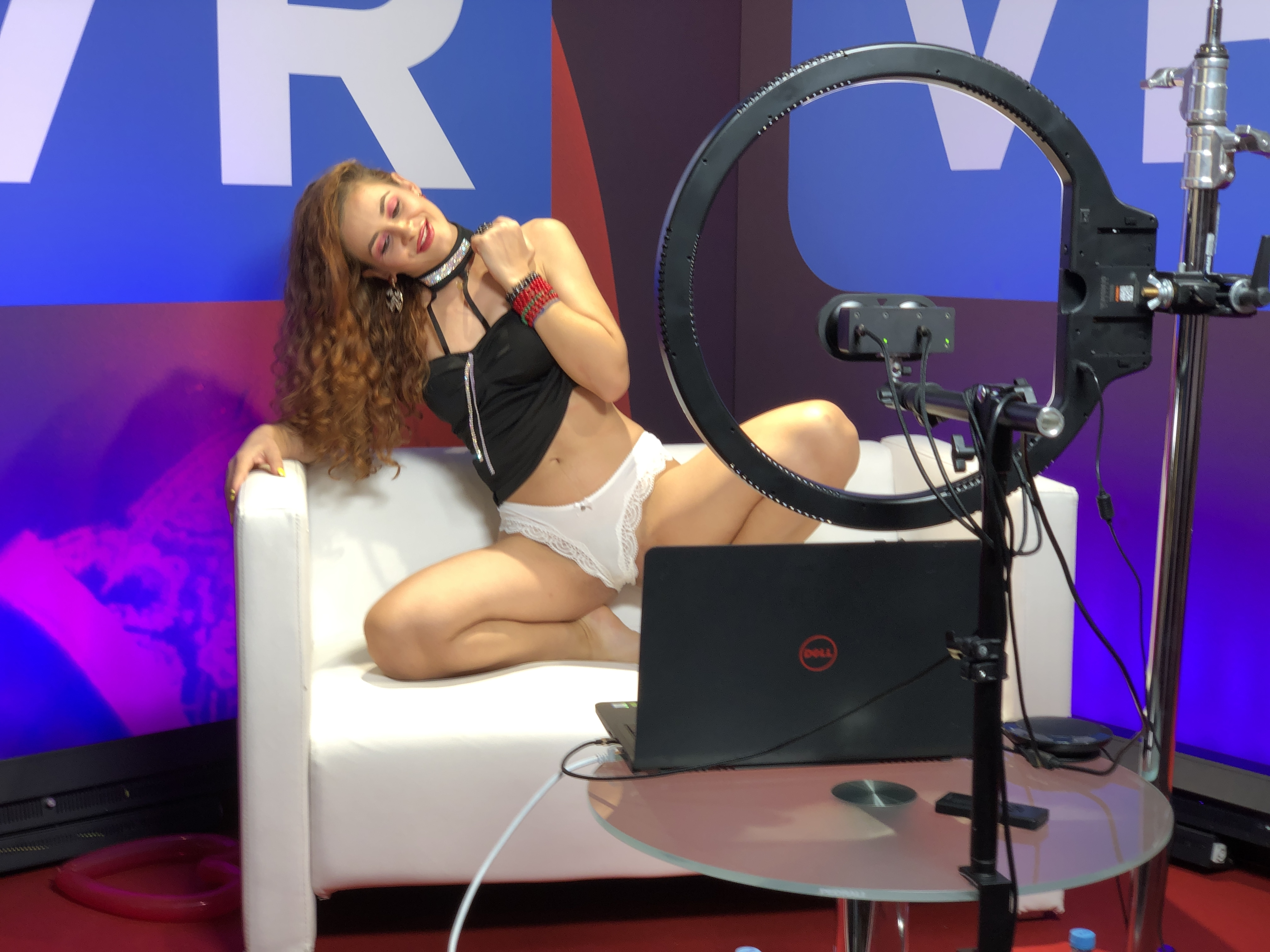
- A webcam model with camera and laptop setup, Venus Berlin event in 2019

Occupation
- Occupation type: Performing arts
- Activity sectors: Sex industry

Description
- Related jobs: Stripper, pornographic film actor

A webcam model (colloquially, camgirl, camboy, or cammodel) is a video performer who streams on the Internet with a live webcam broadcast. A webcam model often performs erotic acts online, such as stripping, masturbation, or sex acts in exchange for money, goods, or attention. They may also sell videos of their performances. Once viewed as a small niche in the world of adult entertainment, camming became "the engine of the porn industry," according to Alec Helmy, the publisher of XBIZ, a sex-trade industry journal.

As many webcam models operate in the comfort of their own homes, they are free to choose the amount of sexual content for their broadcasts. While most display nudity and sexually provocative behavior, some choose to remain mostly clothed and merely talk about various topics, while still soliciting payment as tips from their fans. Webcam models are predominantly women, and also include noted performers of all genders and sexualities.

== Background ==
The conceptual artist Jenny Ringley is generally considered to be the first camgirl. In 1996, as a student at Dickinson College, Ringley created a website called "JenniCam". Her webcam was located in her dorm room and automatically photographed her every few minutes; Ringley viewed her site as a straightforward document of her life. She did not wish to filter the events that were shown on her camera, leading to moments of nudity or sexual behavior, including sexual intercourse and masturbation. These images were then broadcast live over the Internet. Two years later, in 1998, she divided her website's access between free and paying.

In addition to this, in 1998, a commercial site called AmandaCam was launched. Amanda's site, like Ringley's, had multiple cameras around her house, which allowed people to look in on her. However, Amanda theorized that a website's popularity could be greatly increased by enabling viewers to chat with a performer while online, which was successful, and has since had a long lasting impact on the webcam modelling industry. Within her members section, Amanda made it a point to chat with her viewers for over three hours a day. Since the early days of live webcasts by Ringley and Amanda, the phenomenon of camming has grown to become a multibillion-dollar industry, which has an average of at least 12,500 cam models online at any given time, and more than 240,000 viewers at any given time.

=== Payment systems and earnings ===
A camming website acts as an intermediary and aggregator by hosting independent models, and verifies that all are at least 18 years old. Camming websites typically fall into two main categories, dependent upon whether their video chat rooms are free or private. Viewers in private chat rooms pay the performance by the minute. In free chat rooms, payment is voluntary in the form of tips.

Tips are electronic tokens that viewers can buy from a camming website, and then give to the models during live performances to show appreciation. Tokens can also be used to buy access to private shows, operate a teledildonic device that a model may be wearing, or buy videos and souvenirs from a model. The website provides the transactional platform and then collects and distributes a percentage of the tips to the models. For public chat rooms, the model's portion of a tip ranges from 30% to 70%, depending on the cam site.

A July 2020 survey found that the average webcam model in the United States works 18 hours per week, and earns $4,470 per month. Webcam models who work full-time (40 hours per week or more) earn $11,250 per month on average. Top-earning webcam models have a self-reported income of over $312,000 annually, while bottom earners take home as little as $100 per week.

=== Personal connection and interaction ===
Performances can be interactive in both public and private video chat rooms, as viewers and performers can communicate with each other using a keyboard, speech, and two-way cameras. Within public chat rooms, the audience can see tips and viewer comments as scrolling text next to the real-time video stream. Camgirls will frequently read and respond to the scrolling viewer comments. The chatter is constant and is often led by a small band of regular fans.

There have been many instances where conversational interaction became a boon for the erotic entertainment industry. In the early 20th century, sociologist Paul Cressey noted that within the hundreds of taxi-dance halls of America, "the traffic in romance and feminine society" would become available when taxi dancers would offer their companionship and "the illusion of romance" for ten cents a dance. The Mitchell Brothers O'Farrell Theatre strip club is credited with the invention of the lap dance in 1977 when their new stage, New York Live, pioneered customer-contact shows with strippers that came off the stage and sat in the laps of customers for tips. Enabled with this new revenue stream for strippers, the strip club industry went through a period of extreme growth during the 1980s.

There are often connections between erotic video performance and the everyday social lives of camming customers. Webcam performers are often highly entrepreneurial and use mainstream social networking sites such as Twitter, Instagram, Snapchat, Skype, and Tumblr to build and maintain relationships with their customers. Some fans communicate multiple times a day with models through social media.

Unlike traditional pornography, the interactive nature of the camming medium titillates with the promise of virtual friendship. Princeton University sociologist and author of The Purchase of Intimacy, Viviana Zelizer, states: "they're defining a new kind of intimacy. It's not traditional sex work, not a relationship, but something in between." In addition to performing sex work, cam models also perform through their hosting duties, conveying authenticity, creating and animating fantasies, and managing relationships over time.

Within Cam Girlz, a documentary film about the industry, male fans often say that they come to camming sites as a way to fulfill emotional needs. The film's director, Sean Dunne, states of the fans, "they said it's not like a strip club – it's like a community, and you feel it when you're in these chat rooms. It's a community and entertainment that goes very far beyond sexuality."

However, Dr Kari Lerum of the University of Washington suggests that men are more open and vulnerable in cam rooms than in strip clubs, and can become very invested in relationships which only exist on the screen. This proposition was supported by a 2019 study of over 6,000 webcam users by the webcam platform Stripchat. The study found that over 40% of its users had developed significant relationships with their cam models, ranging from friendship to deep emotional connections.

== Terminology ==
The term webcam is a clipped compound, combining the terms World Wide Web and video camera.

When webcam models create live webcasts, the activity is known as camming. A third-party hosting website which transmits multiple webcam models' video-streams is known as a camming site. Webcam models mostly perform individually in separate video chat rooms, frequently referred to as rooms.

The generally derogatory and pejorative term camwhore was used in print as early as November 2001. While commonly applied to sexually explicit performers, the term has also been applied to non-explicit female livestreamers on platforms such as Twitch and YouTube.

== Camming industry ==
As of 2016, the money generated by camming sites was upwards of $2 billion (USD) annually, and the pornography business as a whole is estimated to be about $5 billion. According to the web traffic analysis service Compete.com, LiveJasmin generates more than 9 million unique viewers a month. Similar webcam model hosting sites such as Chaturbate, Cam4, and MyFreeCams boast 4.1 million, 3.7 million and 2 million unique monthly visitors, respectively. Certain hosting sites such as the aforementioned Chaturbate, LiveJasmin, ManyVids, and many other providers also offer payment in cryptocurrency.

The decentralized business model of camming has upended the pornography industry in multiple ways. Camming revenue has been severely cutting into the profits of the pornographic movie business, which has also been eroded for several years by piracy and the distribution of free sexual content on the Internet. The pornographic film industry used to be male-dominated (except for the performers). Since camming usually only requires a video camera, broadband service, and a computer, there has now been a power reversal, and female webcam performers have been driving the industry. Todd Blatt, a former pornographic movie producer, has said, "If you're the middle guy who has been eating off this industry for 20 years, it's a big change. The girls don't need anybody."

The new revolution that the decentralized camming industry has brought also challenged many cultural stereotypes concerning both the camgirls and their customers. Ethnography researcher Dr. Theresa Senft became a camgirl for a year while doing four years of research for her 2008 book, Camgirls: Celebrity and Community in the Age of Social Networks. Senft has described herself as "the first academic camgirl" while becoming a "camgirl writing about camgirls." Anna Katzen, a camgirl who has a postgraduate degree from Harvard, stated during an interview:

The men I meet online rarely fall into the category of anonymous asses who have abandoned all social etiquette, nor do they resemble the pasty, calculator-wristwatch-wearing forebears of chat rooms past. Many, in fact, are successful professionals in their field – whether it be law, the arts or academia. Some of my most popular performances entail me reading erotica, perhaps Anaïs Nin or the Marquis de Sade, in the buff. Oftentimes, the books are gifts from fans, who will probe me for literary analysis if I don't probe myself with something else first.

Furthermore, she states that:

I have unwittingly created a powerful 'brand' for myself: the wild intellectual, the bluestocking in garters. 'I came for the tits, but stayed for the intellectual banter,' remarked one of my visitors, and another stated, 'most guys aren't looking for some airbrushed Barbie. They want real, intelligent girls – like you.' [emphasis in original, links added]

During the COVID-19 pandemic, the webcamming industry experienced explosive growth. The popular platform OnlyFans reported $2.4 billion in transactions in 2020, a 600% increase from 2019. This was driven in part by a large influx of new creators with little or no previous experience in sex work who joined the platform due to unemployment.

=== Hosting websites ===
Webcam models typically make use of third-party websites to stream their real-time video performances on the Internet. Some sites charge viewers a fixed fee per minute, although many allow free access for unregistered visitors. These Internet hosting websites, known as camming sites, take care of the technical work – hosting the video feed broadcast, processing payments, providing an intuitive interface, advertising – so that the cam model only has to focus on the actual shows for their video chat room. A fee can be charged for service as a percentage of the revenue made by the model. To improve security and anonymity, some webcamming services (such as Live Stars) use blockchain technology to handle the payment and to protect the model's entered personal information. SpankChain is another similar camming site and cryptocurrency.

By presenting hundreds of different models via individual chat rooms, a camming site becomes a talent aggregator and middleman. Though a camming website may carry many hundreds of models, they frequently provide an interface for the viewer to easily switch between the most-visited models' rooms, and said interface occasionally resembles the multiple channel selection of cable television.

Most cam models are independent contractors for camming sites, and are usually not employees.

Camming sites typically supply each webcam model with an individual profile webpage where the performer can describe themselves and create a virtual store where they can sell items like videos, photos, personal clothing, and memberships to their fan club. The profile page's virtual store creates a stream of passive income, meaning that even if a camgirl is not online and performing, she can still generate money while fans come to the ever-present profile page to purchase its wares. Some of the most popular items are homemade videos cam models make of themselves. While most of these videos are sexual in nature, they often include elements of comedy, fashion, and a narration of their lifestyles.

The affordability of and access to new video recording technology has spawned new variations and genres of pornography since individual women, as well as industry players, can now create content. A profile page might also sell contact information like a personal phone number, a spot on a model's Snapchat contact list, or the ability to send her private messages through a camming site's friends list. The profile page may also suggest tip amounts for real-time performance requests, like a sexy dance, a song request, removal of clothing, or a particular sex act. All prices on a profile page are listed in quantities of tips, which are electronic tokens that the viewer can buy in bunches from the cam site to be given to various models during the performance, or in later purchases upon the profile page.

The camming site keeps a percentage of the tips, and the amount varies. Big earners can get a bigger chunk of their tips. Commissions earned by webcam models vary widely by website and are usually based on a percentage of gross sales, although sometimes they are in the form of a flat fee. They may also earn money through advertising or commissions by persuading customers to sign up for membership at adult pornographic paysites. Many sites encourage viewers to purchase items from online wish lists. Some webcam models cater to particular fetishes, such as a fascination with feet, and might earn additional money by selling worn socks to patrons. Some models will cater to extremely specific fetishes, as customers with uncommon fetishes tend to pay more. This has been criticized as a "race to the bottom," where webcam models will attempt to outdo each other in perversity. In reaction, cam models on websites such as Chaturbate have developed a culture discouraging engagement in fetishes they consider demeaning.

Camming sites specify rules and restrictions for their cam models, which in turn tend to give the camming site a distinct style and format. For example, one major free-access site, which only allows female models, fosters an environment where the camgirls are not necessarily obligated to do masturbation shows or even display nudity. Consequently, some of that site's models create a more relaxed "hangout atmosphere" within their rooms that occasionally resembles a talk show. Conversely, another major cam site, which allows men and couples to perform, tends to be more sexual and show-oriented. On some sites, models are not required to show their face on the webcam stream (thus allowing the use of veils, masks, ...). Other cam site rules might prohibit working in a public place so that the model does not get a public indecency arrest, the way that Kendra Sunderland was charged after her 2014 performance inside the Oregon State University Library. Models who violate a camming site's rules may be subjected to a temporary or permanent ban from the cam site.

=== Social media ===
Webcam models often rely on social media to interact with existing customers and to meet new customers. This has potential disadvantages; however, mainstream social media platforms often have poorly defined and changing rules that sex workers can inadvertently break. Having a social media account closed for any reason – legitimate or otherwise – can severely affect a performer's ability to earn income.

=== Resources for performers ===
Cam studios allow models to rent facilities outside of their homes. These businesses can supply models with video equipment, Internet service, computer, lighting, and furniture. One example was the pornographic film company Kink.com, which rented individual cam studios in the San Francisco Armory by the hour from 2013 until the building was sold in 2018.

Within some studios, cam models can work by the percentage of business that they bring in, instead of renting studio time. The cam models do not have to pay to join this type of studio and are also not guaranteed a salary. These models can typically charge customers between $1 and $15 per minute, and then the studio keeps half of the gross while the model gets the rest.

Another workplace option is called a "camgirl mansion", which is a place that provides equipment and broadcast rooms, where multiple camgirls can live and share expenses without a studio owner.

Various support websites supply general information about business strategies, upcoming conferences, performance tips, and studio equipment reviews. Support sites also advise on how to protect privacy, discourage piracy, avoid Internet security lapses, and prevent financial scams. Some chat websites for cam models provide message boards for the models, which enables them to discuss their work concerns and issues, such as clients who get overly attached.

Conferences and industry trade shows can also aid cam models by allowing cam models to network and meet others in the profession on a personal level. Cam model Nikki Night provides a coaching service for cam models, in which she advises them on business practices that maximize revenues.

== Legal issues and risks ==
=== Laws ===
Due to the controversial nature of pornography, camming, like most sex work, is not considered a legitimate form of labor in most developed countries. As a result, cam models do not receive the same benefits and rights as other employees since they are technically independent contractors. This offers cam models some freedom not offered to other laborers but prevents them from demanding better treatment from the websites that host them. However, in-person sex work is treated more harshly since it is illegal in many Western countries, including the United States. Camming is considered slightly different, since it is considered pornography as a virtue of being filmed.

While regulation may be beneficial to cam models, since it could prevent them from being exploited for their labor, regulation could also potentially take away cam models' independence. Although in-person sex work such as prostitution can be regulated by policing the streets, online sex work is hard to regulate, due to anonymity, and risk of encroaching on content that is risqué, but not necessarily pornographic. In a study on sex work in East Java, Indonesia where a specific district decriminalized sex work while its surround districts did not, researchers found that anti-prostitution laws decreased the use of condoms, which in effect increased the transmission of sexually transmitted diseases such as HIV.

==== China ====
In accordance with the 1997 penal code, pornography is illegal in China. The law only permits educational or artistic depictions of sexual intercourse. Historically, the law is not interpreted by the government to include pornography under the umbrella of art. As such, camming faces strict regulation on the internet in contrast to Western countries, where its legal distinction protects it from prostitution. However, camming can also be a form of solace for sex workers since it allows them to escape online where they can avoid persecution for their profession.

China has planned to extend anti-camming laws to ASMR. The Chinese government claims that ASMR constitutes pornography, but Chinese ASMR content creators dispute this, arguing that pornographic ASMR represents a different category from non-sexual ASMR.

==== India ====
Sex work is legal in India, but many related elements such as brothels are illegal. Thus, camming is legal in India, but a social stigma remains. There is a narrative that sex workers in India are coerced into their profession, but this is not true of all sex workers. Many sex workers attest that their profession is legitimate labor and should be recognized as such. Due to the illegality of pimping, sex workers like cammers tend to operate independently and thus control their labor and profits.

==== Philippines ====
Sex work is illegal in the Philippines, but enforcement of the law is not strict such that it is quite commonplace. There is a perception that Filipino sex workers are victims of human trafficking, but this is not always the case. Camming, in particular, is usually consensual and not always explicitly sexual, likening it more to performance than pornography.

==== United Kingdom ====
Sex work and camming in the United Kingdom is heavily regulated by the government. Sex work is not recognized as legitimate employment by the government. As a result, sex workers are often afraid to report crimes committed against them, making sex work a dangerous occupation. Sex workers, both online and offline, are often subject to stalking, unwanted messages, and other forms of harassment. It is hard to obtain concrete conclusions from studies on sex work in the UK due to its tenuous legality. Most studies are conducted through surveys which are subject to biases.

A sex work researcher, Rachel Stuart, notes a paradox in British law that tends to focus on the uploading of pornographic recordings, but does not deal with erotic performance when streamed upon the Internet through camming. For instance, the Audiovisual Media Services Regulations 2014 ban certain acts from being depicted and uploaded by pornography producers in the United Kingdom, and the Digital Economy Act 2017 seeks to restrict minors' access to pornographic material online, yet both laws will have no effect if the performances are streamed as opposed to recorded. Stuart states of the legal conundrum in England, "Performing an explicitly pornographic act via a webcam carries no repercussions, but if the same show is recorded and uploaded, the performer can be liable to a fine."

==== United States ====
Lawrence Walters, a Florida lawyer who is an expert in obscenity law, said that there was nothing inherently illegal about web model camming shows, as long as the models were over 18, and performed at home or in a model's studio.

=== Risks ===
While the conduct of webcam models' clients in chat rooms has been described as generally civil and polite, some models have faced "aggressive sexual language" and online harassment. In 2012, a group of 4chan users harassed a webcam model about her weight until she began crying on camera. Even clients who are polite can behave in ways that make models feel uncomfortable, such as when clients become overly attached to, or obsessive, about a model; if the client is a regular customer and a heavy tipper, this can make the model feel pressured to give in to the client's requests. Webcam models have occasionally been the targets of cyber-stalkers and blackmailers. Some cam models have been "blackmailed or threatened into performing acts they are not comfortable with. If they don't comply, they run the risk of having their real identity exposed". In one case, Internet trolls revealed the real name, address and phone number of a webcam performer and posted this information, along with explicit photos of her, on social media, and the account was forwarded to her friends and family. As of 2019, it was reported that there is little legal protection for cam models, as most of the case law deals with the regulation of strip clubs and sex shops, or for distribution of products.

Sex work researcher, Rachel Stuart, reported that while doing her PhD research she encountered webcam models who were concerned about viewers filming and sharing their performances on porn sites, or acquiring personal information which could be used to stalk or blackmail them. In 2013, the New York Times interviewed a woman who prefers to conceal her real identity while working as a camgirl. She revealed that she had been cyber-stalked by a heavy tipper who started making threats and demands about what outfits she should wear. A short while later, she found out that her real name and address had been posted on the Internet along with her cam name. When she complained to the police, they said that they could do nothing, because "putting real information on the Internet is not illegal." She later found out that the same individual had also threatened and outed several other camgirls.

Another issue faced by cam models is that viewers may record streams or images of the model without their consent and then redistribute them on pornography websites. In addition to taking away the model's ability to choose where their content is shown, unauthorized use has been likened to theft of the model's property, since the porn site will earn money from the video and not the cam model.

Sex workers have formed support groups where sex workers may give each other advice and possibly cope with harassment and marginalization. The word "camily", a portmanteau of "cam" and "family", refers to communities formed by sex workers to help deal with such issues.

=== Incidents ===
==== 2000s ====
A New York Times report described the story of Justin Berry, a 13-year-old boy who, after hooking up his webcam and listing himself on an online forum in order to make friends, was propositioned by older men to strip and masturbate on camera. CNN referred to him as "in the language of cyberspace... a cam-whore". He started his own paysite, prostituted himself, sold video recordings of his encounters with Mexican prostitutes, and helped hire other underage models. He made several hundred thousand dollars over five years before turning all information over to prosecutors in exchange for immunity.

==== 2010s ====
In October 2014, a 19-year-old Oregon State University student, Kendra Sunderland, had been working as a camgirl before she made an hour-long video for MyFreeCams.com of herself at the Oregon State University Library, in which she stripped and masturbated on camera for a live audience. She was then charged with public indecency after the show was recorded by someone who was watching MyFreeCams.com online, and then posted it on other sites. Sunderland faced fines up to $6,250 and one year of jail. She pleaded guilty, paid $1,000, and avoided jail. The incident generated headlines around the country and landed Sunderland reported deals with Playboy, and a contract with Penthouse's parent company Friend Finder Networks purportedly worth six figures. The incident greatly increased Sunderland's popularity, and she has continued to do camming and speak positively of it as a career.

In Arizona during 2015, a fan took his appreciation of camgirls to an illegal level when he was indicted for spending $476,000 on a company credit card, which he used for tips on camming websites. He spent more than $100,000 on MyFreeCams.com alone, and sent $26,800 to one cam model in particular to pay for her college tuition bill and new tires for her car. According to the indictment, he also purchased flowers, chocolates, electronic equipment, shoes, a TV, a handbag, laptop computer, and an iPod for some of his favorite camgirls.

In one case, sex traffickers who operated illegal brothels forced an indentured victim to have sex in webcam shows.

In January 2019, a 29-year-old Grant Amato killed his father, mother and brother and staged the scene as a murder-suicide, placing the gun by his brother's body. His motivation was an argument with his parents about his infatuation with a webcam model.

== See also ==
- American burlesque – Genre of variety show
- Content creation – Contribution of information to any media
- Cybersex – Virtual sex encounter
- Exhibitionism – Public exposure of intimate body parts
- Internet pornography – Any pornography that is accessible over the Internet
- Lap dance – Type of erotic dance
- List of chat websites
- LittleRedBunny – American pornographic actress
- Parasocial interaction – Type of psychological relationship
- Sex show – Live performance of sexual activity
- Striptease – Erotic dance
- Subscription business model – Recurring price business model
- Talk show – Type of broadcast show centered around conversation
- Taxi dancer – Paid dance partner in a partner dance
- Voyeurism – Sexual interest in or practice of spying on people engaged in intimate behaviors
