= Clesh =

Cloud-based video editing platform

Clesh (clip load edit share) was a cloud-based video editing platform (active 2006 - 2014), created by Forbidden Technologies plc, designed for consumer, prosumer and online communities to integrate user-generated content. The core technology was based on FORscene which is geared towards professionals working for example in broadcasting, news media, post production. The core technology continues to be actively developed on the elevate.io platform under the Blackbird brand.

Video, audio, and graphical content was uploaded to Clesh via a standard web browser, a mobile device such as a phone / tablet, or desktop software for DV capture over FireWire. The hosted material could then be reviewed, searched, edited, and published online by anyone with a standard web browser or compatible mobile device.

Clesh supported storyboard shot selection, frame-accurate editing, transitions and various other functions such as; pan, zoom, colour and light correction, and audio levels. Content were published in formats for example; Podcast, Mpeg2, HTML video or in a proprietary Java format.

Cloud-based software provides greater scope for sharing information and collaborating compared to LAN or desktop based systems. Users of cloud-based software rely on the cloud's owner for adequate security, performance and resilience.

Clesh never asserted any rights over uploaded content in contrast to other platforms (such as YouTube). All rights to any content uploaded to Clesh remained with the Author.

== Features ==
Some of the services that were available to Clesh users:

- Access via Java enabled desktops or Android smartphones or tablets
- Real-time video rendering including effects and transitions
- Multiple audio tracks
- Secured log-on
- Frame accurate timeline for fine cut editing
- Logging / meta-data annotation assigns text to portions of video (usable by Clesh and web search engines)
- Storyboard assembles rough cuts using drag-and-drop
- Import, host, organise and search for media (DV tape and various video, audio, and still image formats)
- Publish content to in formats such as podcast, MPEG-2, web (Java Applet), Flash, Ogg, HTML and JPEG
- Chatrooms to talk to other Clesh users
- Showreel (a gallery for publishing material visible to internet users)
- Moderation for approval of material prior to distribution downstream
- Re-branding and integration support for white-label deployment

== Technology ==
Clesh was based on the same technology as FORscene. An array of servers on the internet backbone provide the cloud computing platform to host Clesh. As a white-label solution Clesh could be branded and hosted per the client requirement.

== User interface ==
End-users accessed Clesh on clients such as standard Java-enabled Web Browsers and / or Android enabled mobile devices such as tablets and smartphones.

== History and subsequent development ==
Clesh was developed by Forbidden Technologies plc as a prosumer-oriented version of its FORscene cloud video editing platform.

It was launched in 2006 as a web-based video editing service, with its technology derived from the same cloud-based platform that underpinned FORscene. The company subsequently extended Clesh to mobile devices, including Android tablets and smartphones.

The development of Clesh formed part of the wider evolution of Forbidden Technologies' cloud video technology. Following the company's development of FORscene and Clesh, the technology was subsequently commercialised under the Blackbird brand. Blackbird plc later developed elevate.io, a browser-based collaborative video editing and content creation platform built using the company's core Blackbird technology.

elevate.io was developed as a creator-focused application. Blackbird plc describes elevate.io as being built using its core technology and aimed at professional teams and the creator economy.

== See also ==
- Jaycut
- WeVideo
