= DTube =

Video sharing platform

- Website type: Video hosting service
- Available in: 13 languages
- Website: d.tube
- Launched: 2017; 9 years ago
- Current status: Active
- Written in: TypeScript, Svelte

DTube is a video sharing platform originally launched in 2017 as a decentralized alternative to YouTube. Initially built on the Steem blockchain and the InterPlanetary File System (IPFS), the platform aimed to offer censorship-resistant video hosting with cryptocurrency-based creator rewards. After years of declining activity and technical challenges, DTube was relaunched in December 2025 as a conventional ad-supported video platform, retaining only a lightweight peer-to-peer feature for video delivery.

== Reception ==
Martin Brinkmann, writing for ghacks, praised DTube as a safe service that is free from censorship and algorithms that artificially alter video rankings, though said it lacked content compared to YouTube. Julia Alexander, writing for Polygon, said that due to its laissez faire moderation, DTube was becoming home to controversial and disturbing topics, and that its main competition to YouTube was conspiracy videos and right-wing talking heads. A 2020 journal article published in IEEE Xplore found that the quality of streaming on DTube was similar to that of YouTube, concluding that "decentralized video streaming may present a feasible alternative to centralized services in the future".

== See also ==
- Comparison of video hosting services
- List of online video platforms
