= Pixorial =

Defunct cloud-based media platform

- Industry: cloud-based software
- Founded: 2007
- Key people: Andres Espineira
- Products: Pixorial's app
- Services: photo sharing video sharing video editing platform

Pixorial was a cloud-based consumer photo sharing, video sharing and video editing platform. The company was formed in 2007 in Centennial, Colorado as a media conversion service. In 2013, Pixorial was chosen as one of two video storage companies to partner with the launch of Google Drive. Pixorial allowed users to edit and share videos on social channels by connecting through their Pixorial account. The company closed on July 18, 2014, and its assets were acquired by LifeLogger Technologies Corp in November 2015.

== History ==
The company was founded in 2007 and launched in 2009 by former Netscape employee Andres Espineira. Changing its focus to video editing software in 2009, Pixorial began developing an app that would be launched for iOS and Android devices in 2011. Later developments in the app in 2012 would also included real time filters, which were later removed. With the launch of Google Drive in 2012, Pixorial was chosen as an integrated video partner. This integration with Google Drive allowed users to access videos stored in Google Drive within the web app of Pixorial. After the Google Drive launch, Pixorial developed a crowdsourced, location-based video sharing app, Krowds. The app was cited in July 2012 by PC Magazine as one of "The 8 Best Apps for Making and Sharing Videos on Your iPhone". In late July, Pixorial replaced its original mobile app with the MyPlayer HD app that optimized HD video viewing for large screen viewing including tablets and smart televisions. Pixorial's services terminated on July 18, 2014.

== Products ==
=== Krowds App ===
Pixorial's app was launched in April 2013 for iOS, and in May for Android, as a tool to aggregate event videos through location based collections. The app was launched to generally positive reviews.

=== Movie Creator ===
Launched July 12, 2012 Pixorial's Movie Creator allowed users to edit movies in a simple story-telling platform Movie Creator's features include transitions, text boxes, access to free music tracks, credits, and social media sharing capabilities. The Pixorial platform allowed users to view, share, and edit videos without modifying the original. Movie Creator integrated pictures and video to create user movies.

== Awards ==
- 2012 Apex Award from the Colorado Technology Association, for Best Technology Project of the Year
- 2010 Computerworld Laureate for Media, Arts and Entertainment

== See also ==
- List of video hosting services
- Comparison of video hosting services
- List of photo-sharing websites
