= MaYoMo =

User-generated news site

- Map Your Moments
- Website type: Citizen journalism
- Owner: MaYoMo B.V.
- Website: mayomo.com (archived)
- Launched: 2009

MaYoMo was a user-generated news site for mobile citizen journalism. MaYoMo.com, short for "Map Your Moments", was officially launched in October 2009. The site was owned by MaYoMo B.V., which is based in Amsterdam, the Netherlands.

== Features ==
Global news and local stories by the site's community of contributors was geolocated on an interactive world map, depending on the place they have happened. With an "Ask for News" option users could request news and information about particular events from any place of the world . The news content was ordered at a timeline, according to its date of action. One could set the time indicator to any year and date between the year 1895 and 2100 for a narrower search criteria. Users could comment and also rank on a scale from 1 to 5 on each news submission.

MaYoMo hosted user-generated video news about virtual worlds like Lineage II, Half-Life, World of Warcraft, FIFA, Second Life, etc., on "Virtu ", a so-called virtual continent, placed between North America and Africa.

In February 2010, MaYoMo had 60,000 videos from 130 countries. The site was available in 11 languages: Arabic, English, French, German, Greek, Italian, Japanese, Simplified Mandarin, Traditional Mandarin, Russian, Spanish.

== See also ==
- Citizen journalism
- Video journalism
- Collaborative journalism
- Mobile news
- User-generated content
- List of video hosting services
