= List of chat websites =

This is a list of websites used for online chat.

Website	Description	Messaging?	File sharing?	Send video?	Receive video?	Website?	Android app?	iOS app?	Adult?
7 Cups	Trained listener support for emotionally distressed people	Yes	No	Yes	Yes	Yes	Yes	Yes	No
Airtime.com	Group live video streaming and instant messaging	Yes	Yes	Yes	Yes	Yes	Yes	Yes	No
BongaCams	One-way webcam model live video streaming	Yes	No	Yes	Yes	Yes	No	No	Yes
Chat-Avenue	Adobe Flash and PHP-based chat rooms	Yes	Yes	Yes	Yes	Yes	No	No	Yes
Chatroulette	Two-way live video streaming between random pairs of people	No	No	Yes	Yes	Yes	Yes	No	Yes
Chaturbate	Two-way webcam model live video streaming	Yes	No	No	Yes	Yes	No	No	Yes
Discord	Group live video streaming and instant messaging	Yes	Yes	Yes	Yes	Yes	Yes	Yes	No
Gitter	Instant messaging for software development	Yes	No	No	No	Yes	Yes	No	No yapzychat
Google Hangouts	Group live video streaming and instant messaging	Yes	Yes	Yes	Yes	Yes	Yes	Yes	No
HipChat	Instant messaging for enterprise software development, integrates with Atlassian products	Yes	Yes	No	No	Yes	Yes	Yes	No
LiveJasmin	One-way webcam model live video streaming	Yes	Yes	Yes	Yes	Yes	Yes	Yes	Yes
Meebo Rooms		Yes	No	No	Yes	No	No	No	No
MyFreeCams	One-way webcam model live video streaming	Yes	No	No	Yes	Yes	No	No	Yes
Paltalk		Yes	Yes	Yes	Yes	Yes	Yes	No	No
Rounds		Yes	Yes	Yes	Yes	Yes	Yes	No	No
Slack	Instant messaging for Enterprise software development	Yes	Yes	No	No	Yes	Yes	Yes	No
Stickam	One-way webcam model live video streaming	No	No	No	No	No	No	No	Yes
Stripchat	One-way webcam model live video streaming	Yes	Yes	Yes	Yes	Yes	Yes	Yes	Yes
Talkomatic		Yes	Yes	Yes	Yes	Yes	No	No	No
Tinychat		Yes	Yes	Yes	Yes	Yes	Yes	Yes	No
TokBox		Yes	Yes	Yes	Yes	Yes	Yes	Yes	No
Userplane		Yes	Yes	Yes	Yes	No	No	No	No
Woo Media		Yes	Yes	Yes	Yes	Yes	No	No	No
Xfire		Yes	Yes	Yes	Yes	Yes	No	No	No

== See also ==
- Chat room
