= Chat-Avenue =

Online chat website

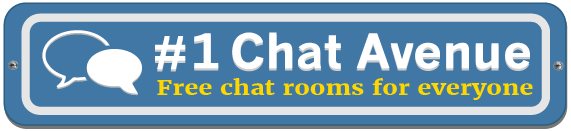
- Website type: Entertainment
- Available in: English
- Area served: Worldwide
- Industry: Chat
- Services: Chat
- Website: chat-avenue.com
- Advertising: Yes
- Registration: Optional
- Launched: June 7, 2000; 26 years ago
- Current status: Active

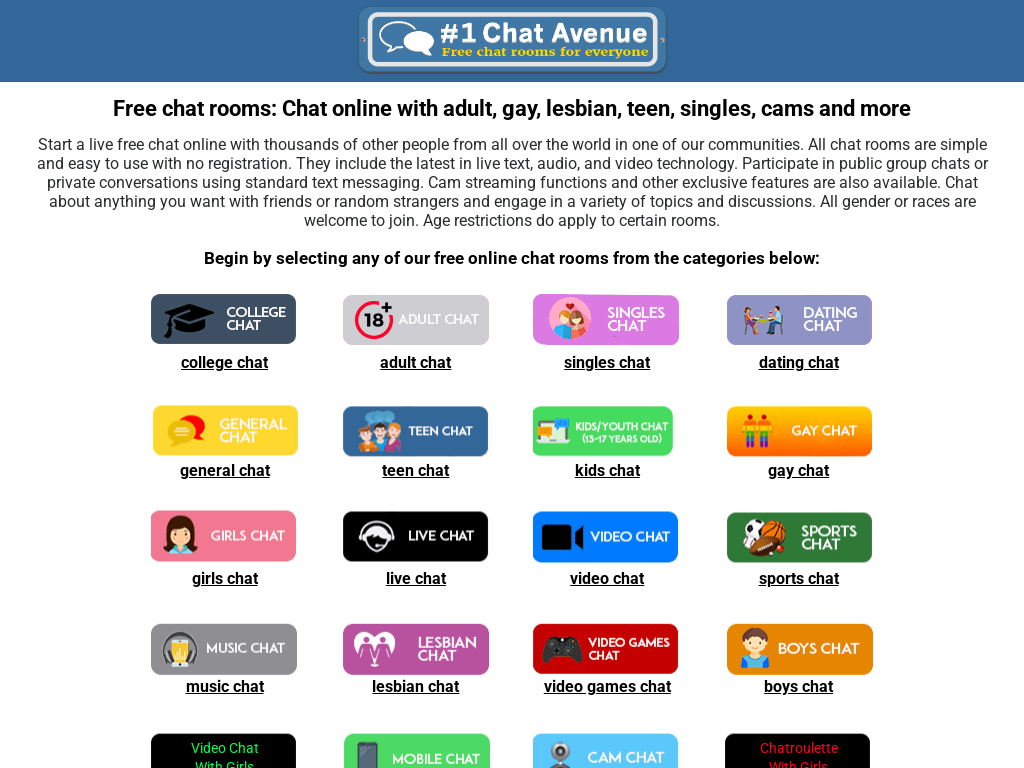
The main page of Chat Avenue

Chat Avenue is a website that hosts chat rooms. A total of 19 chat rooms are currently available (College Chat, Adult Chat, Singles Chat, Dating Chat, General Chat, Teen Chat, Gay Chat, Girls Chat, Live Chat, Video Chat, Sports Chat, Music Chat, Lesbian Chat, Video Games Chat, Boys Chat, Mobile Chat, Cam Chat, Free Chat, and Sex Chat).

Originally launched with DigiChat software based on Java, it was subsequently changed and built with 123 Flash Chat, an Adobe Flash-based software for in-browser chat rooms in October 2005. In 2018, new PHP software was added to the website due to browser restrictions and the upcoming end-of-life announcement by Flash. In 2021, new chat software was added enabling user support of a webcam. The chat rooms are administered by volunteer moderators and administrators.

== Law enforcement and concerns with minors ==
Some chat rooms on Chat Avenue have been used in law enforcement efforts to catch online predators. On September 18, 2018, New Jersey Attorney General Gurbir Grewal announced the arrest of 24 alleged child predators in “Operation Open House,” an undercover operation targeting individuals using social media to lure underage users. Chat Avenue was among the sites mentioned in the operation.

In February 2021, a Channel 4 television series documented a police unit tracking sexual predators online, featuring Chat Avenue as one of the platforms used.

== See also ==
- List of chat websites
- Online chat
