= ViaStreaming =

Internet streaming company

ViaStreaming Inc.
- Company type: Private
- Industry: Streaming Hosting Services
- Genre: Internet Radio
- Founded: London, United Kingdom
- Founder: Cross Digital Ltd.
- Area served: Internet
- Products: SHOUTCast Servers; Flash Media Servers; Windows Media Servers; Mobile audio & video streaming applications development
- Owner: Private
- Website: Home Page

ViaStreaming Inc. is a Streaming Media Hosting Provider, as well as a Flash Media Server, SHOUTcast and Windows Media host. They are headquartered out of Jersey City, New Jersey, United States, where a data center is operated. The company was formed in October 2004.

ViaStreaming currently owns and operates private racks in 3 different data centers (USA-Europe): their multi-homed network is powered by premium Tier 1 network bandwidth featuring diverse path OC-48 fiber connectivity and they partnered with large internet bandwidth providers such as Time Warner Cable, Level3, NTT, AT&T and TeliaSonera using the AOL Bandwidth Internet Backbone, also through several direct peerings. The servers of their content delivery network are each connected to a 10 Gbit/s dedicated switch.

ViaStreaming has grown to over 2,000 users, making them one of the most active audio stream hosts available on the internet. Currently they offer dedicated servers in mp3, Aacplus, Flash Media Server and Windows Media formats in USA and Europe. ViaStreaming (CrossDigital Ltd.) also owns and operates another brand: ViaMobileApps that develops custom audio & video streaming apps for Smartphones and Tablets mobile devices (Android, iOS, Research In Motion).

As of April 2022, the viastreaming.com website has been indicating certain streaming servers have been down for some weeks, but is not responding to related support requests.
