= Gan Jing World =

Video sharing platform affiliated with Falun Gong

- Website type: Video sharing platform
- Available in: Multilingual
- Headquarters: Middletown, New York, United States
- Owner: Ganjingworld Corporation
- Website: www.ganjingworld.com
- Launched: July 4, 2022

Gan Jing World (Chinese: 乾净世界) is a video-sharing and streaming platform founded in 2022 by practitioners of Falun Gong. Headquartered in Middletown, New York, it is closely associated with the right-wing news organization The Epoch Times.

In addition to Falun Gong-related content, the site also hosts videos taken from YouTube without the consent or awareness of the original creator. In December 2024, YouTube filed a lawsuit against Gan Jing World over this issue.

== Background ==
Falun Gong, (Note: UK: /ˌfɑːlʊn ˈɡɒŋ, ˌfæl-, -ˈɡʊŋ/ FAH-lun GONG, FAL-, -GUUNG, US: /- ˈɡɔːŋ/ -GAWNG) also called Falun Dafa, (Note: /ˈdɑːfə/ DAH-fə; lit. 'Dharma Wheel Practice') is a new religious movement founded by Li Hongzhi in China in the early 1990s. The movement was built on interest in qigong with additional religious and moralistic dimensions, and includes claims that its practices can cure illness, including serious or terminal illnesses, without modern medicine. It gained popularity in part through its health claims and practitioners' beliefs in their effectiveness. Falun Gong has its global headquarters in Dragon Springs, a 173-hectare (427-acre) compound in Deerpark, New York, United States, near the residence of Li.

== Platform ==
The official website of Falun Gong, Minghui.org, has encouraged people to engage with the website. The site's Falun Gong-related content, such as videos of Shen Yun dance performances and New Tang Dynasty Television media, account for the majority of engagement on the site. Gan Jing World's videos are presented as following a "no violence, no pornography, no crime, and no drugs" policy.

According to the Columbia Journalism Review and Intelligencer, Gan Jing World's other videos are often taken directly from YouTube without the consent or knowledge of the original creators. This includes copyrighted work. A former employee of another Falun Gong-affiliated media group, Epoch Times, has alleged that they were encouraged to pseudonymously repost content to Gan Jing World. 404 Media reported in March 2024 that Gan Jing World was not hosting these reposted videos directly, but was linking to embedded videos on YouTube's servers. YouTube described this as a violation of their terms-of-service which harmed creators, and issued a cease and desist letter to Gan Jing World. Following this letter, Gan Jing World only removed channels which were provided as examples in the letter without changing its practices. In April, YouTube sent a second letter, with Gan Jing World again removing examples while denying an wrongdoing. In December 2024, YouTube sued Gan Jing World, alleging mass copying of content for commercial purposes, and violation of California unfair competition laws. As of April 2025, the lawsuit was ongoing, with Gan Jing World accusing opposing lawyer Wilson Sonsini of Wilson Sonsini Goodrich & Rosati of being a "Chinese puppet", which Sonsini described as a baseless conspiracy theory which was "beneath the dignity of the bar".

The site also offers members only content, a paid course, and sells books about Falun Gong.

== Headquarters ==
The company's primary facility is located at 33 Fulton Street in Middletown, New York. The organization and the property are part of a network of Falun Gong-affiliated companies and organizations in the town, including New Tang Dynasty television, Epoch Times, and the Shen Yun performing arts group.

== Sources ==
- Junker, Andrew (2019). Becoming Activists in Global China: Social Movements in the Chinese Diaspora. Cambridge University Press. pp. 23–24, 33, 119, 207. ISBN 978-1108655897.
