= HD share =

- Company type: Subsidiary of USN
- Website type: Video hosting service
- Founded: 2008
- Headquarters: Wilmington, DE, United States
- Owner: United Social Networks
- Website: www.hdshare.tv
- Launched: July 1, 2008
- Current status: Offline

HD share was a video sharing website where users could upload, view and share video clips.

HD share was launched on 1 July 2008. The site used Flash Video to display content and was one of the first websites to exclusively host high definition videos.

Sometime in 2011, HD share was shut down after its sale to United Social Networks LLC based in New York. The company used their technology to develop niche social networks.

== Technical Information ==
HD share's video playback technology was based on Macromedia's Flash Player. This technology allowed the site to display videos with quality comparable to more established video playback technologies (such as Windows Media Player, QuickTime and RealPlayer) that generally required the user to download and install a web browser plugin in order to view video. Flash also required a plug-in, but Adobe considered the Flash 7 plug-in to be present on about 90% of online computers. Users could view videos in windowed mode or full-screen mode, and it was possible to switch modes during playback without reloading it due to the full-screen function of Adobe Flash Player 9. Third-party media players like GOM Player, Gnash, and VLC, along with some ffmpeg-based video players, could also play back the video.

Videos uploaded to HD share weren't limited in length and had a maximum size of 4 Gigabytes. The best format that HD share could display was 1280*720.

- Video formats: Cinepak, DV, H.263, H.264/MPEG-4 AVC, HuffYUV, Indeo, MJPEG, MPEG-1, MPEG-2, MPEG-4 Part 2, RealVideo, Sorenson, Theora, WMV
- Audio formats: AAC, AC3, ALAC, AMR, FLAC, Intel Music Coder, Monkey's Audio, MP3, RealAudio, Shorten, Speex, Vorbis, WMA

== History ==
HD share was created in the beginning of 2008 as a project between three students in Switzerland. The website was launched in a test version on 1 July 2008 and was upgraded a few times before closing in 2010 due to an uncertain future. In 2011, the company was acquired by United Social Networks, which aimed to develop the website worldwide and open video-sharing markets to small communities.

== Restart of operations ==
On September 29, 2010, HD share and USN announced the restart of development operations and an upcoming reopening of the website, aiming to host exclusively high-definition content. A new beta version was brought online briefly in July 2011 for testing before the company ultimately shifted focus later that year.
