= Redlasso =

Broadcast media website

Redlasso, Inc.
- Company type: Privately Funded
- Website type: video sharing
- Founded: June 13, 2005
- Headquarters: King of Prussia, Pennsylvania, U.S.
- Key people: Al McGowan, CEO; Kevin O'Kane, President; Gil Edwards, Chief Content Officer
- Website: www.redlasso.com
- Registration: Private Beta
- Current status: active

Redlasso is a broadcast media website which allows users to search, clip, and share licensed television and radio content. Initially envisioned as a video clip search engine, the company currently seeks to help publishers "extend the life of their perishable content in a secure and controllable platform, while giving users the ability to share the content they are interested in".

== History ==
Redlasso initially refused to suspend its operations after receiving a cease-and-desist letter from CBS, NBC and Fox. Responding to a letter from the networks demanding that Redlasso stop hosting unlicensed clips of their content, Redlasso indicated that it would not stop because it believed its activity was legally permissible.

On July 27, 2008, NBC Universal, Inc., Fox News Network, LLC and Fox Television Stations, Inc. filed a copyright infringement suit against Redlasso in the United States District Court for the Southern District of New York. Notwithstanding its prior announcement that it would continue its operations and make broadcast clips available to the public, Redlasso discontinued its service two days after the networks' complaint was filed.

On October 22, 2008, the court entered final judgment permanently enjoining Redlasso's service.

On March 25, 2009, Fox Television Stations (FTS) and Redlasso have entered into an agreement that licenses the online broadcast media center the rights to syndicate content from the group's local television news programs.
