= Cam4 =

Live streaming website

CAM4.com
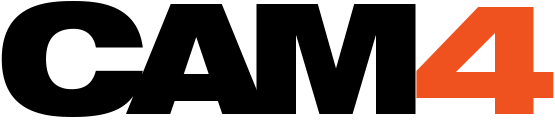
- Website type: Webcam, live streaming
- Available in: multilingual
- Country of origin: France
- Website: www.cam4.com
- Commercial: Yes
- Registration: Optional
- Launched: June 2007; 19 years ago
- Current status: active

Cam4.com (stylized CAM4), is a French live streaming website featuring live performances by primarily amateur performers. Streams on Cam4 often feature nudity and sexual activity. In 2020, Wired reported that Cam4's production server did not have a password set in their ElasticSearch instance, a common security mistake, which may have exposed user information.

== Concept ==
Cam4 is used mostly by amateur performers who stream video and audio. Customers can purchase virtual tokens, which can be used to tip performers or pay for private shows. Customers can use live text chat in each performer's "room" or to communicate directly to each other. Cam4 has paid out more than $100m in performer commissions since its inception in 2007.

== Strategic partnerships ==
In May 2016, Cam4 partnered with VRtube.xxx to launch Cam4VR, a 360° 3D virtual reality live cam experience available on the Cam4 platform. VRTube.xxx co-founder, Ela Darling spearheaded the initiative. The site is working with Ela Darling to distribute virtual reality cameras to models.

In February 2017, Cam4 announced a partnership with teledildonics manufacturer Kiiroo, launching a "live touch" feature that syncs the vibration of the Kiiroo sex toy to tokens tipped during a live webcam show.

== Sponsorships ==
Cam4 is a diamond member of the Free Speech Coalition and has been a title sponsor of the Association of Sites Advocating Child Protection (ASACP) since 2011.

In September 2017, Cam4 teamed up with American model and activist Amber Rose in support of The Amber Rose SlutWalk, a nonprofit advocacy organization that works to end slut-shaming and to spark a conversation on women's empowerment and LGBTQ rights.

Cam4 is a principal sponsor of the New York AIDS Walk.

In September 2021, Cam4 announced its renewed sponsorship of Pineapple Support, a non-profit organization that offers low cost mental health services for adult industry professionals.

== Campaigns ==
In 2016, Cam4 commissioned a global research study from French Research firm iFop, designed to better understand female orgasm habits and the differences between nationalities.

To mark New York Fashion week, CAM4 formed a collaboration with jewelry designer Chris Habana to open a pop-up store on the Lower East Side of New York City. At the night's opening, models and sex workers, including François Sagat and Amanda Lepore, modeled a new jewelry collection.

== Industry recognition ==
The XBIZ Award for Live Cam Site of the Year was awarded to Cam4 in 2015. In 2016, Cam4 won an Adult Webcam Award for Best European Adult Webcam Site. Additionally, a Cam4 co-founder was inducted into the Adult Webcam Awards Hall of Fame.

== Awards and nominations ==
XBIZ Awards
Year	Result	Award
2015	Won	Adult Site of the Year – Live Cam
2019	Nominated	Cam Company of the Year
2019	Nominated	Cam Site of the Year
2019	Nominated	Cam Site of the Year – Gay

== See also ==
- Internet pornography
- Cybersex
- Online chat
