= Tribute (website) =

American video-sharing website

- Website type: Online video platform software as a service
- Founded: 2014
- Headquarters: Brooklyn, New York
- Founders: Andrew Horn; Rory Petty
- Website: tribute.co

Tribute is an American video-sharing website headquartered in Brooklyn. Created in 2014 by Andrew Horn and Rory Petty, the platform lets customers create video montages (called "tributes") for occasions including weddings, birthdays, anniversaries, get well soon, and memorials. Tribute.co allows users to record video messages, request submissions from friends and family, insert photos, add music, and send the resulting video tribute montage to a recipient.

== Overview ==
Tribute's collaborative technology starts with inviting people to contribute via email, SMS or social media. Participants receive a prompt to record a short video via their phone, computer or tablet. The site's video editing software allows users to drag and drop the clips in their desired order without prior video editing experience.

== History ==
When Andrew Horn turned twenty-seven, his girlfriend, Miki Agrawal surprised him with a video montage containing clips of his family and closest friends explaining why they loved him. This resulted in Andrew's idea to create Tribute–a "living eulogy" video-compilation service that he co-founded with software engineer Rory Petty.

Founded in 2014, Tribute's activity accelerated in 2020 due to the COVID-19 pandemic, and it had sent over 5 million videos as of December 2021. While social distance restrictions were in effect, the site provided a way for people to connect while in-person celebrations were put on hold.

For each video sold, Tribute makes one available to hospitals for free and has partnered with Cleveland Clinic Cancer Center in Ohio, Lurie Children's Hospital in Illinois and CarePoint Health in New Jersey.
