= SpankChain =

Blockchain based adult payment company

SpankChain is an adult entertainment website and cryptocurrency exchange mostly used for exchanges in the sex work industry. Users pay for services using SpankChain Ethereum-based coin "SPANK". The SpankChain's tokens are sometimes referred to as "SpankCoin".

== History ==
In April 2018, SpankChain offered a $25,000 reward to sex workers who revealed information about political clients who supported the passing of the FOSTA/SESTA acts, which regulated sex work in the United States. The company reportedly had 6,000 users as of October 2018, and it was considered to be one of the most successful cryptocurrency sites in the industry at the time.

In 2018, a malicious attacker stole 165 Ether (valued at $40,000) from SpankChain by exploiting a vulnerability in the Ethereum blockchain. After the cryptocurrency bubble of 2018 burst, the company downsized to eight employees. In 2019, the company launched SpankPay, a payment platform for online pornography.
