= Jaycut =

Video editing software

JayCut was an internet based video editing software tool that along with competitors Jumpcut.com, Motionbox and Eyespot were the first to offer this Web 2.0 feature pioneered by Blackbird, later also added by YouTube through Adobe. Visitors edited directly in the web browser without downloading application software. In July 2011, Jaycut was acquired by Research in Motion. Subsequently, the free video editing service shut down on January 31, 2012.

== History ==
Development of the JayCut technology started Q1 2006 by a few Swedish students at the Royal Institute of Technology in Stockholm. In December 2006 a primitive public alpha was launched, and the site started getting press coverage, for example being elected the 5th hottest IT startup by Internetworld. In June 2007, the public beta of JayCut was launched in two languages (English and Swedish), followed by Spanish in November and Polish in January 2008. Since June 2007 the site has undergone massive changes focused on developing the editing functionality and group collaboration.

In July 2011, Jaycut was acquired by Research in Motion.

On November 30, 2011, JayCut announced that they would be ceasing the free video editor, effective January 31, 2012. JayCut shut down the 'register' option on their site immediately, meaning that only existing members would be allowed to use the free video editor until January 31, in order to allow users to download and retrieve unsaved and unfinished projects that they had on their JayCut accounts. On January 30, 2011, RIM stated that they would be discussing JayCut at Mobile World Congress in February 2012. The free video editing service shut down entirely on January 31, 2012.

== Competition ==
JayCut's original competitors were Eyespot and Jumpcut.com, all offering video editing online but based on very different technologies. Other competitors that entered later were Flektor and Motionbox. All of these competitors have since shut down or been acquired.

The main difference is related to the technology, where JayCut allows download of the edited videos.

== Publish/Download output ==
JayCut allows users to download their videos to their Personal Computer or Mobile Phone, or publish their videos on video-sharing websites, like YouTube. User-made JayCut videos have a 4:3 fullscreen aspect ratio, however, the videos don't carry a 16:9 widescreen aspect ratio.

== Press coverage ==
JayCut has been featured internationally in BusinessWeek and Emprendedores, as well as in several local Swedish newspapers.

Three reviews were also made in Read/Write Web, ChromebookRatings, and Lifegoggles. Recently, IDG interviewed CEO Jonas Hombert regarding the news that Oprah Winfrey made use of the platform.
