= TroopTube =

TroopTube was an online video site from the U.S. military via their organization Military OneSource, to help military families connect and keep in touch while miles apart. TroopTube allowed people to register as members of one of the branches of the armed forces, family, civilian Defense Department employees or supporters. Members could upload personal videos from anywhere with an Internet connection. The videos were reviewed for content based on the terms of service before being posted to the site.

In May, 2009, TroopTube was recognized by the White House Office of New Media as an innovative way for people to connect with troops, and was featured in a video produced by the White House. While access to TroopTube is blocked at some military bases, it was accessible via many other military bases and available to military families around the world. The site was based on technology developed by Delve Networks.

On July 31, 2011, the Department of Defense, Office of the Secretary of Defense closed the TroopTube web site citing declining usage as a result of the DoD's social media policy implemented in February 2010, permitting wider access to social media and video sharing websites.
