= MediaCore =

Canadian educational technology company

- Company type: Private
- Industry: Educational Technology
- Founded: 2011
- Founder: Stuart Bowness, Damien Tanner
- Headquarters: Victoria, British Columbia, Canada
- Services: Video Platform For Education
- Website: mediacore.com

MediaCore was an educational technology company that was founded in June 2011 in Victoria, British Columbia, Canada by Stuart Bowness and Damien Tanner. It aims to help educators capture, manage and share educational content to students, faculty and staff through its cloud hosted media platform. It was acquired by Workday, Inc. in 2015.

== Features ==
MediaCore provides higher education institutions with a cloud hosted platform to share media with students, staff and faculty across the internet. It integrates with learning software like Moodle, Canvas, Blackboard and Snagit and provides mobile applications for iOS, Android and Windows phone to capture and upload video.

MediaCore supports automatic closed captioning from both 3Play Media and Cielo24.

== Clients ==
MediaCore's clients include Indiana University, Columbia University, and the University of London.

== Reception ==
Fast Company named it as one of the world's top 10 most innovative companies in digital video. In 2012, it was also selected as the recipient of the 2012 BCIC New Ventures competition.

== Discontinuation of platform ==
On October 5, 2015, Mediacore users received email informing them that Workday would be discontinuing the Mediacore video platform as of January 31, 2016.

== See also ==
- Educational Technology
- Flipped Classroom
- Instructure
