= Tune.pk =

- Screenshot of Tune.pk homepage
- Company type: Pvt. Ltd.
- Website type: Video hosting service
- Founded: 1 January 2012
- Headquarters: Lahore, Pakistan
- Area served: Worldwide
- Founders: Arslan Hassan; Jahanzeb Hassan
- Key people: Arslan Hassan (CEO); Jahanzeb Hassan (COO)
- Industry: Internet; Video hosting service
- Parent: Integrated Units Pvt. Ltd.
- Website: Tune.pk
- Registration: Optional (not required to watch most videos; required for certain tasks such as uploading videos, viewing flagged (18+) videos, creating playlists, and posting comments)
- Launched: 1 January 2012; 14 years ago
- Current status: Inactive since 2020
- Content license: Uploader holds copyright (standard license); Creative Commons can be selected.
- Written in: Python, PHP

Tune.pk (stylised as Tune Pakistan, tune.pk or TPK) was a video-sharing website based in Pakistan on which users can upload, watch and share videos. The site requires registration to upload and rate videos but unregistered users can also watch, share and comment. It offers local and regional content of Pakistan and is available worldwide. Its website uses ClipBucket, a video-sharing script along with HTML5 and Adobe Flash to play user generated video content.

== History ==
Two Pakistani brothers, started off the tune.pk website, with the aim to promote Pakistani music, from the living room of their home.

=== Development over the years ===
==== 2007–11 ====
When TPK was launched for the first time in 2007, the site was using customised third party software's, which backfired after a total of 15 days and the site was taken down by the hosting provider. The reason for the take down was the unauthorised script. The whole fiasco prompted the making of ClipBucket in a whopping 30-day time span. The basic aim behind the coming into being of ClipBucket was to own a script that would help in bringing back Tune.pk. Tune.pk was launched again in 2008, but the site could not take off due to the inexperience of the team. Then again, in 2009, the site was relaunched but couldn't work because of lack of technical resource. Then again the site could not take off in 2010 and 2011 due to inconsistent traffic and insufficient funding respectively.

==== 2012–13 ====
2012 was the year when YouTube was banned from Pakistan on accounts of blasphemy. While that was happening, the team of Tune.pk was ready to launch the website once again. Upon relaunch TPK's iOS application was introduced to the users for the first time. Other than that the idea for video delivery network (VDN) was also conceived in the same year.

In the beginning of 2013, the first traffic milestone was achieved by TPK and the site started receiving an inflow of 100K visitors a day. Also, a dedicated video-delivery network (VDN) for the site was created in real time. The site also started offering pre-roll ads to the local brands of Pakistan which in turn opened gates for digital advertisement in the country. In June 2013, TPK went cross-border compatible and also launched its android application. Moreover, in the same year TPK's video encoding was re-engineered, a new interface was launched for the site with an added custom playlist feature and by the end of 2013, the visitor inflow on site reached to a 1 million user daily.

==== 2014–15 ====
In 2014, Tune.pk was restructured so that it can cater to the global market. Other than that work was started on proprietor stats server 'Tune-Lytics', Tune.pk's application for Windows was launched along with TPK's ad server. Afterwards, pre-filtering and moderation technology were introduced into the system. Later on, the statistics server for the site went live so that the user can keep tabs on views and other video-related numbers. Tune.pk also entered into a digital partnership with Qubee. Towards the end of the year, TPK shifted to an HTML5 player, caching was successfully applied at TW in Pakistan and a better optimised version of TPK was launched.

2015 was all about partnerships and entering into new liaisons for Tune.pk. Tune.pk shook hands with Dot republic media and Kaymu in the first quarter of 2015. One other major partnership was that with ismart films as digital media partners for Pocket Cinema Film Festival (PCFF), the first one of its kind to be held in Pakistan. Tune.pk also upgraded its player to be VAST and VPAID compliant, became cross compatible with HTML5 technology and got approved on the Sizmek platform. Live streaming services were offered by the site in May of the same year. Other than technical enhancements, a couple of BTL activities were initiated by the brand to gain market recognition and to create awareness among the general masses. One noteworthy step taken by Tune.pk was the launch of their Pakistan Timeline on 14 August 2015. In September 2015, Tune.pk completed its 3 years of operations and the site was upgraded and a new design was introduced, complete with new features. Other than that 60+ hosted streaming machines were added to the system to upgrade services. With its new design, Tune.pk also added the white hat system to the website. 17+ Ad networks were added to the websites list of advertisers.

==== 2016 ====
2016 saw the era of some major changes for Tune.pk. Digital media partnerships were done for two most prestigious university events in Lahore; Bestival and Softec. A dedicated page for trailers upload was also launched so that the viewers can have one stop access to latest released trailers. Activation's were done for Mother's Day, Father's Day and Independence Day during 2016 to create awareness and brand recognition on-ground. On independence Day, TPK paid tribute to Abdul Sattar Edhi for his efforts for the betterment of humanity.

Also TPK completed 4 years of operations in September 2016. The 4th anniversary introduced a wave of some new features. The major one of those was the launch of Tune player V4. Other than that a proper ticketing function was added so that the users could seek support from the team instantaneously. Also a notification panel, user feedback system and messaging system was integrated on-site to give users a better and well connected experience. The closing of 2016 saw digital media partnerships with PakWheels and Click TV.

==== 2017 - 2018 ====
In 2017, Tune.pk released new apps and features. Tune.pk saw a tremendous improvement in overall traffic and user engagement. Tune.pk also introduced live streaming feature, Video Management Suite VMS, Tune Social and HTML 5 Player.

In 2018, Tune launched important features and also gained its international footprints by opening Tune offices in Dubai and Ireland.

==== 2020 ====
In 2020 the site got defunct the developers got tired and bored

== Location ==
The head office of Tune.pk is located in PIA Society, Lahore, Pakistan. Previously the company was headquartered in Sialkot and all the operations were based in there. Even though major operations are being handled from Lahore, the company has its offices in Sialkot and Karachi as well.

== Platforms ==
Tune.pk's video-sharing application is available for iOS, Windows, and Android

== Criticism ==
In January 2015, Tune.pk was criticised by a local blog ProPakistani for aggressively marketing itself as a platform to access YouTube videos. They also demanded to block TPK for giving users access to YouTube content through Tune.PK chrome extension. In response to this criticism, Tune.pk changed course and accepted responsibility for diverting from its main objective. The service was immediately retracted and a new model was introduced for content uploaders.

== Global Blackout ==
On 6 February 2016, Tune.pk faced a global blackout because of Google DNS. The services remained suspended for a total of 4 hrs and the problem could not be tracked. The users had to face inconvenience due to the whole scenario.

== Tune Trailers ==
In 2016, Tune.pk launched a page dedicated solely to trailers, teasers and clips related to movies and TV series. Tune Trailers hosts content from Lollywood, Bollywood and Hollywood.

== Tune With Mustafa ==
Tune with Mustafa is an in-house production initiative taken by Tune.pk. It is a social media-based interview show that aims to create a bridge between the celebrities of Pakistan and the general audience. Other than celebrities, national heroes are also interviewed through the medium to familiarise the audience with the struggle of the people who are heroes in real life and whose efforts are not yet appeared on the forefront.

== Monetization on Tune.pk ==
In 2017, an 'Earn Money' button was added to the top right corner of Tune Player. The basic purpose of this button was to make the process of revenue generation on user content easier. With the button, users will be able to request activation of monetisation program with only a click. This will provide an easy gateway for publishers to connect with Tune.pk.
