= Ogelle =

Video-sharing service owned by Reddot Television Network

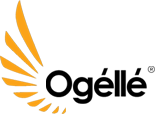
- Company type: Subsidiary
- Website type: Video hosting service
- Founded: April 18, 2019; 7 years ago
- Headquarters: Africa North America
- Area served: Worldwide
- Founder: Osita Oparaugo
- Key people: Alan Kessler (Director); Uche Okoronkwo (Company Secretary)
- Industry: Entertainment; Technology
- Parent: Reddot Television Network Limited (2016–present)
- Website: ogelle.com (see list of localized domain names)
- Registration: Optional: Not required to watch most videos; required for certain tasks such as uploading videos, viewing flagged (18+) videos, creating playlists, liking or disliking videos, and posting comments
- Launched: April 18, 2019; 7 years ago
- Current status: Active
- Content license: Uploader holds copyright (standard license); Creative Commons can be selected.

Ogelle was an online video-sharing platform headquartered in Nigeria. Ogelle was launched on 18 April 2019, during the official launch in Lagos, Nigeria. As of April 2024, Ogelle's website was no longer live.

Dubbed the "YouTube" of Africa, Ogelle was the first African only user-generated content resource and entertainment platform. Available content included video clips, TV show clips, films, music, comedy, tourism, cuisine, vocation, news and lifestyle which are all created and produced by Africans.

== History ==
Ogelle was launched in 2019, its parent company, Reddot Television Network Limited was founded by Osita Oparaugo. Ogelle had its launch event in Lagos Nigeria in April 2019 and in Accra, Ghana in May 2019. Ogelle has its headquarters in Rwanda and office in Nigeria. The name 'Ogelle" was derived from the Igbo word Ogelle which means "Gong".

== Features ==
=== User features ===
Ogelle allowed users to upload, view, rate, share, add to playlists, and comment on videos. It offered a wide variety of user-generated and corporate media videos. Available content included video clips, TV show clips, music videos, short and documentary films, audio recordings, movie trailers, and other content such as video blogging, short original videos, and educational videos. Most content on Ogelle was uploaded by individuals, but media corporations offered some of their material via Ogelle as part of the Ogelle partnership program, which had a reward plan to monetize contents. Unregistered users could only watch (but not upload) videos on the site, while registered users were also permitted to upload an unlimited number of videos and add comments to videos. Age-restricted videos were available only to registered users affirming themselves to be at least 18 years old.

=== Ogelle vocation ===
Ogelle introduced an vocational education content feature to enable users learn vocational skills and knowledge.
