= Vidme =

2016-2017 video hosting service

- Website type: Video hosting service
- Available in: English
- Headquarters: Los Angeles, California, U.S.
- Owner: Bit Kitchen
- Website: www.vid.me
- Launched: January 22, 2014; 12 years ago
- Current status: Closed since December 15, 2017; 8 years ago

Vidme was a video hosting service that launched to the public in 2014. It described itself as a hybrid between video hosting website YouTube and social news site Reddit. It shut down in 2017.

== History ==
The company was founded in 2014 by Warren Shaeffer and Alex Benzer in Los Angeles, California, and was originally called Viddme. After gaining in popularity, Vidme purchased the domain for Vidme and changed its name. In April 2015, the site received a $3.2 million Series A round of funding. Investors in the seed round included Mark Suster of Upfront Ventures and Reddit co-founder Alexis Ohanian. As of April 2015, Vidme had 30 million unique visitors per month. The following year, it received a $6 million round.

== Closure ==
On December 1, 2017, after nearly four years of operation, Vidme announced on Reddit that it would shut down on December 15, 2017. Vidme stopped accepting new uploads or new members at that time. The site's closure was due to, according to the company, not finding a sustainable model and due to an increase in competition. In particular, Google (through YouTube), Facebook, and Instagram were named by co-founder Warren Shaeffer as too competitive for Vidme.

On their website, the team announced that they would be launching a new website called Digital Objects (digitalobjects.art), which later was discontinued.

Vidme was acquired by Giphy and shortly after Bit Kitchen was renamed to Knowable once it was launched.

In July 2021, the Vid.me domain name was acquired by a pornography company. As a result, news articles and social media posts with an embedded Vidme video instead displayed hardcore pornography. The Washington Post, New York Magazine and The Guardian were some of the major news sites that were affected.

== See also ==
- BitChute
- Vimeo
- Odysee
