= Rounds (website) =

Social networking website

Rounds Webcam Chat Platform
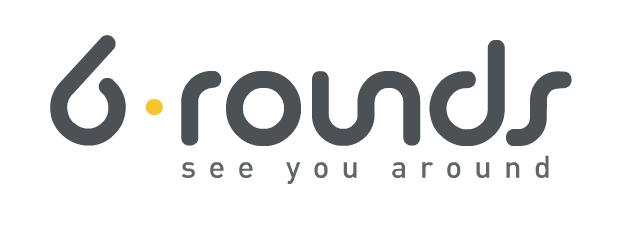
- Company: GixOO LTD.
- Type: Subsidiary of Kik Messenger
- Launched: July 2009
- Slogan: See You Around
- Headquarters: Tel Aviv, Israel
- Key People: Dany Fishel, CEO; Ilan Leibovich, COO; Dmitry Shestak, CTO
- Website: www.rounds.com
- Platform: Cross-platform

Rounds (formally known as 6rounds) is a video-enabled real-time social network with collaborative browsing, chat, multi-player gaming and built-in social recommendation features that can be expanded through an open API. Rounds was founded by Israeli entrepreneurs Dany Fishel, Ilan Leibovich and Dimitry Shestek in February 2008. Fishel is Rounds' CEO and Ilan Leibovich is the company COO. The company is based in Tel Aviv, Israel.

Rounds is the first product released using the GixOO software platform, which was created in April 2008.

== History ==
Rounds launched in July 2009.

Rounds released an API for game, entertainment and collaboration-based applications in April 2010. The company changed its name from 6rounds to Rounds in August 2010. Rounds also released its application that allows users to video chat, exchange pictures, surf the internet and play games via Facebook in August.

Rounds released Android and iOS applications in December 2012.

The company discontinued the "Meet New People" feature of its platform in February 2013. Rounds retired the feature out of concerns about security and privacy of its users, most of whom are under the age of 25. In December 2013, company also announced its integration with Vidyo's technology that allows video chat capabilities to Google Hangouts.

In January 2017, Rounds has been acquired by the Canadian messaging service, Kik Messenger, for a reported $60-$80 million. Kik will acquire all 35 employees of Rounds and turn its Tel Aviv office into a Kik product and engineering center, which will be its first international base.

== Features and uses ==
Rounds users create their own (embeddable) personal slide show to inform other users about themselves. Users connect through messaging and video chats (referred to as rounds). They initiate rounds either by inviting a specific person or by joining a specified room based on activity, game or topic. Once users join a specified round they are systematically matched with another user interested in the same type of round.

As of 2013, Rounds requires a pre-existing Facebook friendship before users can begin video chatting one another.

While chatting, users can share in various activities, including watching videos on YouTube, co-browsing on Facebook, and playing games such as chess, backgammon, checkers, and truth or dare.

== External features ==
The Rounds platform offers an open API which allows third party integrations, from small scaled modifications to white-label solutions. Rounds was one of the first Google Wave extensions to be featured and the only video chat to be launched at the Google Wave beta launch.
