= MyFreeCams =

American adult camming website

MyFreeCams.com

- Screenshot
- Website type: Webcam, live streaming
- Founder: Leonid Radvinsky
- Parent: Mfcxy, Inc.
- Website: www.myfreecams.com
- Commercial: Yes
- Registration: Optional
- Launched: August 28, 2004; 22 years ago
- Current status: Active

MyFreeCams (MFC) is an American website providing live webcam performances by models, typically featuring nudity and sexual activity often ranging from striptease and erotic talk to masturbation with sex toys. Male performers are prohibited from appearing on screen, but female performers may appear in pairs or groups, and can perform sex acts with each other.

== History ==
MFC was launched in 2004, although its domain was registered in 2002. In 2010, It was described by industry group XBIZ as "one of the world's largest adult webcam communities." It was reported as having more than 100,000 models and more than five million members. CNBC reported the opinion of an adult industry talent agent that models on the site can make "between $75,000 and $100,000 per month", leading some established porn stars into becoming webcam models. In 2014, it was reported to be "the 344th most visited site on the internet". Like many similar websites, MyFreeCams features a large number of Romanian, Colombian, Czech, Filipina, Ukrainian and Russian performers, though "on the performer side there are more Americans on MyFreeCams" than on other sites.

Google Trends showed a steady decline in people searching for MyFreeCams after 2015.

By 2018, MyFreeCams had acquired 75% ownership of Fenix International Limited, the parent company of OnlyFans, a subscription service.

MyFreeCams occasionally facilitates special events for models. For example, in January 2019 the company arranged a private concert for models only, featuring a performance by rapper Cardi B.

In 2018, the Government of India blocked MyFreeCams, among other porn websites, after a Uttarakhand High Court court order demanding the same in a rape case where the perpetrators said they were motivated to do so after watching online pornography.

== Concept ==
MFC is used mostly by amateur webcam models, or camgirls, who earn money for their performances on the site. Customers of the site can purchase virtual tokens, which can be used to tip performers or watch private shows. Customers can use text-based live chat to talk to each other or in each performer's channel. The performers use a webcam and microphone to broadcast live video and audio to their channel. Both members and performers can send private messages and mail to each other.

The website does impose some restrictions on the activities performed by models on cam. For example, in February 2015 a webcam model who had been charged with a misdemeanor for broadcasting an MFC show from a public library at Oregon State University, was "banned from MyFreeCams for violating their guidelines and filming in a public place." Although no police charges were laid, the site also banned a model who engaged in similar activity at branches of the Windsor, Ontario Public Library over a three-month period.

== Industry recognition ==
The XBIZ Award for Live Cam Site of the Year was awarded to MFC in 2011, 2012, and 2013. It was additionally named one of the top 50 Industry Newsmakers of 2011 by XBIZ. In 2014, MyFreeCams.com won an AVN award for Best Live Chat Website.

== See also ==
- Chat room
- List of chat websites
