= Stripchat =

Adult camming website

- Available in: Multilingual (20)
- Area served: World wide, except blocking countries
- Industry: Sex
- Website: stripchat.com
- Advertising: Yes
- Registration: Optional
- Launched: May 3, 2016; 10 years ago
- Current status: Active

Stripchat is a Cypriot based adult website and social network featuring free live-streamed webcam performances, often including nudity and sexual activity, through traditional, virtual reality, and mobile broadcasts.

The site averages over 700 million visitors a month, according to Similarweb. The site was first launched in 2016 and has since won numerous awards, including "Cam Site of the Year" and "Cam Company of the Year" at the 2020 XBIZ Europa Awards.

The company has attracted mainstream attention with controversial campaigns and offers, such as offering $15M to rename the New Orleans Superdome and providing jobs to crew members who walked off the set of Mission: Impossible – Dead Reckoning Part One following a rant by Tom Cruise.

== COVID-19 pandemic ==
Stripchat and other cam sites saw significant growth in 2020 due to the COVID-19 pandemic. During the lockdowns in March 2020, visits to the site increased by 25% in countries such as the United States and the United Kingdom. Even after restrictions were lifted in most countries, traffic continued to rise, reaching nearly 120 million in August 2020, up from about 60 million in January 2020, a reverse of traditional traffic patterns.

By November 2020, monthly visits to the site were more than double what they had been a year earlier. In the same period, the number of models appearing on the site increased by 300,000. In an interview with BBC News, a Stripchat representative said that many traditional adult performers had moved to camming due to the lack of production on traditional pornography sets, as had other types of sex workers and amateurs. Stripchat attempted to offset increased competition from new performers coming onto the site by providing free tokens for new users.

Many of the new website users are the result of changing work patterns. According to data released by the company in June 2020, 75% of site visitors came between the hours of 10 am and 6 pm.

In June 2020, following the extended shutdown of many businesses due to the COVID-19 pandemic, Stripchat offered small businesses free advertising on the platform. The company asked small businesses to send in branded clothing to distribute to its most popular models. Multiple businesses applied and were accepted, including an art supply company, an erectile dysfunction device, a photography studio, and a makeup artist. Models wore the clothes during their regular shows.

== Sexuality Resource Center ==
In addition to its adult content, Stripchat manages the Sexuality Resource Center, featuring videos of therapists answering questions about sex and relationship issues. The site began hosting live stream sessions with licensed therapists from the Sexual Health Alliance in July 2019, after a study of users showed that many felt anxiety about their cam viewing.

== Sports partnerships ==
Stripchat has repeatedly sought business relationships with pro athletes and sports organizations. In 2020, Stripchat offered the New Orleans Saints $15M in hopes of gaining naming rights for the Superdome. In March 2021, the company made a £20 million bid to replace the Italian tire company Pirelli as the lead sponsor of the Inter Milan football organization, after Pirelli failed to renew a nearly three-decade-old deal.

In May 2021, UFC fighter Nick Diaz announced that he had partnered with the company to conduct self-defense webinars.

== Virtual reality ==
Stripchat introduced immersive virtual reality (VR) cam shows in 2019, describing them as fully interactive broadcasts compatible with major headsets at launch (e.g., Meta Quest, Apple Vision Pro).

- The service is accessed directly in a VR headset's web browser—no dedicated application or external connections are required—by opening the site's VR interface and entering VR mode within the player.
- Users typically access the feature by visiting vr.stripchat.com or stripchat.com from a compatible VR browser and selecting "Enter VR."
- Because Stripchat's VR playback relies on browser-based XR (WebXR), the best-supported experiences are via the built-in browsers on Meta Quest headsets and Apple Vision Pro.
- On Meta Quest, VR video sites are opened directly in the Meta (Oculus) Browser and played in-headset.
- Apple enabled WebXR in Safari on Apple Vision Pro in 2024, allowing browser-based immersive playback once WebXR is turned on in Settings → Apps → Safari → Advanced → Feature Flags.

Reviewers note that Stripchat's VR rooms stream in high resolution and are positioned as a differentiating feature among live-cam platforms.

== Awards and nominations ==
List of accolades received by Stripchat since 2019
Awards & nominations
Award	Won	Nominated
Venus Awards	1	1
XBIZ Awards	6	6
YNOT Awards	2	0
AW AWARDS	5	0
Bucharest Summit	4	0
LALEXPO Awards	4	0
Live Cam Awards	10	0
- Total number of wins and nominations
Totals	32	7
- References

Venus Awards
Year	Result	Award
2023	Won	Best Livestream Site
2023	Nominated	Cam Site of the Year

XBIZ Awards
Year	Result	Award
2019	Nominated	Cam Affiliate Program of the Year
2019	Nominated	Cam Company of the Year
2019	Nominated	Cam Site of the Year
2020	Won	Cam Affiliate Program of the Year
2020	Won	Cam Company of the Year
2020	Won	Cam Site of the Year
2021	Nominated	Cam Affiliate Program of the Year
2021	Nominated	Cam Company of the Year
2021	Nominated	Cam Site of the Year
2022	Won	Cam Site of the Year
2022	Won	Cam Affiliate Program of the Year
2023	Won	Cam Affiliate Program of the Year

AW AWARDS
Year	Result	Award
2019	Won	Freemium camsite of the year
2019	Won	Best Software
2019	Won	Exec Award
2021	Won	Live Cam Site of the Year
2022	Won	Best Adult Platform

YNOT Awards
Year	Result	Award
2021	Won	Best Cam Platform (Europe)
2022	Won	Cam Site of the Year

Bucharest Summit
Year	Result	Award
2022	Won	Freemium camsite of the year
2023	Won	Best Affiliate Program (StripCash)
2023	Won	Freemium camsite of the year
2023	Won	Best MobileBroadcast Site

LALEXPO Awards
Year	Result	Award
2019	Won	Best International Cam Site
2020	Won	Most Innovative Live Cam Site
2021	Won	Best European Live Cam Site
2021	Won	Live Cam Industry Representative

Live Cam Awards
Year	Result	Award
2019	Won	Best Emerging Live Cam Site
2020	Won	Most Innovative Live Cam Site
2021	Won	Best European Live Cam Site
2021	Won	Live Cam Industry Representative
2022	Won	Most Innovative Live Cam Site
2022	Won	Live Cam Industry Representative
2023	Won	Most Innovative Live Cam Site
2023	Won	Best Affiliate Program
2024	Won	Best Freemium Cam Site
2024	Won	Best Live Cam Coach

== See also ==
- Webcam model
- Internet pornography
- List of chat websites
- Porn 2.0
