= Metacafe =

Defunct Israeli video-sharing website

Metacafe, Inc.
- Company type: Privately held company
- Website type: Video hosting service
- Founded: July 2003; 23 years ago
- Dissolved: 28 August 2021; 5 years ago
- Key people: Reza Izad
- Current status: Defunct/Inactive

Metacafe was an Israeli video-sharing website, launched in July 2003. During the mid-2000s it was one of the largest video-sharing websites, though it eventually began to be superseded by YouTube, Vimeo and Dailymotion. On 28 August 2021, Metacafe's website and social profiles became inactive.

== History ==
Metacafe Inc. was founded in July 2003 in Tel Aviv by Israeli entrepreneurs Eyal Hertzog (Chief Technical Officer) and Arik Czerniak (CEO) and raised $3 million from Benchmark Capital. In June 2006, the company closed a Series B financing round of $12 million. Investors included Accel Partners and Benchmark Capital. That September, the company moved its headquarters to Palo Alto, California and in October, Metacafe was ranked the third largest video site in the world according to comScore. It used to attract more than 13 million unique monthly U.S. viewers and streamed more than 53 million videos in the U.S. each month, according to comScore Video Metrix (March 2011). The site's global audience was more than 40 million unique monthly viewers.

In its early years, Metacafe was similar to other video viewing websites such as YouTube or Dailymotion, but later turned into a short-form video entertainment. The company's partners had included marquee content providers such as major movie studios, video game publishers, broadcast and cable TV networks, music labels and sports leagues.

The site was supported through ads, and worked closely with brands in the entertainment, consumer electronics, telecommunications, consumer packaged goods, food & beverage, and automotive sectors.

In 2007, Erick Hachenburg, previously an executive with Electronic Arts, took over as CEO of the company. By then, the company had shifted its focus on user-generated short videos (8 minutes or shorter) targeting the categories "short, funny, sexy or stupid". In August 2007, its traffic had reached 4.2 million in the US, compared to 56 million for YouTube. Its annual revenue was around $10 million.

In June 2012 it was reported that Metacafe had been acquired by digital talent agency The Collective. Headquarters were moved to San Francisco, California, with another office in Los Angeles.

=== Producer Rewards ===
In October 2006, Metacafe announced its Producer Rewards program in which video producers were paid for their original content. Through this program, any video that was viewed a minimum of 20,000 times, achieved a VideoRank rating of 3.00 or higher, and did not violate any copyrights or other Metacafe community standards was awarded $5 for every 1,000 U.S. views.

The program had several success stories, some of which have been featured on national TV, such as The Can Tossing Video, the Beer Launching Fridge on David Letterman, and the Ron Paul Girl series by Liv Films, as featured on Fox News and CNN.

== Closure ==
On 28 August 2021, with neither warning announcement, Metacafe's website became inactive. Until October 2022 the URL redirected to VideosHub.

== Description ==
On Metacafe, user-submitted videos were screened by moderators before being posted. Supposedly 80,000 volunteers were available to handle that task. Each new video would be sent to 200 reviewers, aiming for at least 25 reviews.

Metacafe shared revenues with content creators, offering $5 per thousand views, but unlocked only once a video reached the 20,000 views minimum threshold.

== See also ==
- Comparison of video hosting services
- Veoh
