= List of most-visited websites =

As of October 2026, Google Search is the world's most visited website, followed by YouTube, Facebook, Instagram, and ChatGPT.

This list and its two reference data sources, Similarweb and Semrush, do not account for app traffic, which constitutes the largest share of overall internet traffic.

== List ==
Data is compiled from Similarweb rank (as of October 2026), and Semrush rank (as of October 2026).

Website	Domain name	Similarweb (October 2026)	Semrush (October 2026)	Type	Owner	Country
Google Search	google.com	1	1	Search engine	Alphabet	United States
YouTube	youtube.com	2	2	Video-sharing platform	Alphabet	United States
Facebook	facebook.com	3	3	Social media	Meta	United States
Instagram	instagram.com	4	5 (▼)1	Social media	Meta	United States
ChatGPT	chatgpt.com	5	4	Chatbot	OpenAI	United States
X	x.com	6	8	Social media	X Corp.	United States
TikTok	tiktok.com	7 (▲)1	11	Social media	ByteDance	China
WhatsApp	whatsapp.com	8 (▲)1	7 (▲)3	Instant messenger	Meta	United States
Reddit	reddit.com	9 (▼)2	6	Social media	Reddit	United States
Microsoft Bing	bing.com	10	12	Search engine	Microsoft	United States
Wikipedia	wikipedia.org	11	9	Encyclopedia	Wikimedia Foundation	United States
Yahoo Japan	yahoo.co.jp	12	24 (▼)6	News	LY Corporation	Japan
Amazon	amazon.com	13 (▲)2	13	E-commerce	Amazon Inc.	United States
Yandex	yandex.ru	14	28 (▲)2	Search engine	Yandex	Russia
Gemini	gemini.google.com	15 (▼)2	N/A	Chatbot	Alphabet	United States
Yahoo!	yahoo.com	16	14	News	Yahoo! Inc.	United States
LinkedIn	linkedin.com	17	17 (▲)1	Social media	Microsoft	United States
Microsoft 365	cloud.microsoft	18	49	Software	Microsoft	United States
Baidu	baidu.com	19	N/A	Search engine	Baidu	China
Pinterest	pinterest.com	20	22 (▲)1	Social media	Pinterest	United States
Naver	naver.com	21	35 (▼)3	News	Naver Corporation	South Korea
Netflix	netflix.com	22	18 (▲)7	Streaming service	Netflix, Inc.	United States
Outlook.com	live.com	23	30 (▼)3	Email	Microsoft	United States
Bilibili	bilibili.com	24	N/A	Social media	Bilibili	China
Claude	claude.ai	25 (▲)6	21 (▲)10	Chatbot	Anthropic	United States
Pornhub	pornhub.com	26 (▼)1	4 (▲)6	Pornography	Aylo	Canada
xHamster	xhamster.com	27	20	Pornography	Hammy Media Ltd	Cyprus
Twitch	twitch.tv	28	22 (▲)5	Livestreaming service	Amazon Inc.	United States
Microsoft	microsoft.com	29 (▼)3	23 (▲)3	Software	Microsoft	United States
Temu	temu.com	30 (▼)1	31 (▼)4	E-commerce	Temu	China
Dzen News	dzen.ru	31 (▼)1	N/A	News	Zen News	Russia
VK	vk.ru	32	N/A	Computers Electronics and Technology	VK	Russia
Canva	canva.com	33	32 (▲)1	Software	Canva Pty Ltd	Australia
Globo	globo.com	34 (▲)7	42 (▼)2	News	Grupo Globo	Brazil
XVideos	xvideos.com	35 (▲)1	9 (▲)6	Pornography	WGCZ Holding	France
Weather.com	weather.com	36 (▼)2	24 (▼)6	Weather	The Weather Channel	United States
Yahoo! News Japan	news.yahoo.co.jp	37	N/A	News	LY Corporation	Japan
Stripchat	stripchat.com	38 (▲)1	N/A	Adult camming	Stripchat	Cyprus
GitHub	github.com	39 (▲)8	23 (▲)7	Technology	GitHub	United States
Samsung	samsung.com	40 (▼)2	51	Consumer electronics	Samsung	South Korea
ESPN	espn.com	41 (▲)3	N/A	Sports	ESPN	United States
Mail.ru	mail.ru	42 (▲)1	54	Email	VK	Russia
Fandom	fandom.com	43 (▼)3	N/A	Wiki hosting service	Fandom Inc.	United States
Brave	brave.com	44 (▲)2	N/A	Web browser	Brave	United States
xHamster	xhamster46.desi	45 (▲)7	12	Adult	xHamster	India
The New York Times	nytimes.com	46 (▲)7	N/A	News & Media Publishers	The New York Times	United States
DuckDuckGo	duckduckgo.com	47 (▼)2	19 (▼)3	Search engine	DuckDuckGo	United States
Zoom Communications	zoom.com	48 (▲)1	N/A	Computers Electronics and Technology	Zoom Communications	United States
Telegram	t.me	49 (▲)1	37	Computers Electronics and Technology	Telegram	United Arab Emirates
Apple Inc.	apple.com	50 (▼)8	N/A	Computers Electronics and Technology	Apple Inc.	United States

== See also ==
- List of search engines
- List of most popular social platforms
