= Blackbird (software) =

Video editing software

- Developer: Blackbird plc. (formerly Forbidden Technologies plc.)
- Stable release: Blackbird / 25 January 2007; 19 years ago
- Operating system: Cross-platform
- Type: Video editing software
- License: Proprietary
- Website: blackbird.video

Blackbird plc is a British technology company specialising in cloud-based video technology. The company operates in three principal areas: development and licensing of its proprietary video codec and associated technology; Blackbird (formerly named FORscene), an enterprise cloud video editing and publishing platform primarily serving broadcasters, sports and news organisations, an integrated internet video platform, video editing software, covering non-linear editing and publishing for broadcast, web and mobile; and elevate.io, a browser-based collaborative video editing and content creation platform aimed at creators, professionals and businesses. The Blackbird and elevate.io platforms both use the company's underlying patented technology and codec.

Blackbird won the Royal Television Society's award for Technology in the post-production process in December 2005.

== elevate.io ==
In March 2024, Blackbird plc announced the general release of elevate.io, a video creation and editing platform built on the company's proprietary codec technology. Features include requiring only a web-browser to use it, real-time multiplayer collaboration and review, frame-accurate editing, long and short-form support, and third-party integrations for example; subtitling, text-to-speech, Pexels stock video and Epidemic Sound music library. The platform is based on a freemium model.. In October 2026 it was announced elevate.io would feature in Google's Chromebook Perks program.

== Codecs ==
Blackbird has its own codecs for both video and audio. These use a form of adaptive coding to allow local variations in the type of data to be encoded efficiently. Designed to allow collaborative editing of video at resolutions of up to 540p and up to 60 frames per second on bandwidths as low as 2MBit/s, the technology is capable of video logging, reviewing, publishing and hosting through HD and 4K to UHD quality from original sources.

=== Osprey ===
Osprey supports loss-free video compression. Blackbird users can see broadcast quality video during editing (as well as proxy quality as has been the case with Blackbird's other codecs) and broadcasters can use the video output from Blackbird directly for transmission.

=== Blackbird ===
The current Blackbird video codec is called Blackbird 9. It is designed for both editing and video streaming over variable speed broadband Internet connections. By varying the frame rate, it can provide consistent picture quality even on slow connections.

Like its predecessor Firebird (used in the FORlive system), the Blackbird codec allows real time compression and playback of video. This is important for handling the quantity of video in modern productions, as well as the reviewing, logging, editing and publishing features of Blackbird.

The Blackbird codec (formerly "Firebird") is a proprietary video codec developed by Forbidden Technologies and used by their flagship product, Blackbird (formerly "Forscene").

Blackbird is designed for both editing and video streaming over variable speed internet connections. Blackbird can provide consistent picture quality on slow connections by varying the frame rate through the use of tokens. The tokens represent each source image which are scaled versions of each source image.

The Blackbird video codec facilitates a content-aware dynamic framerate. The codec can create a lightweight proxy, which can be used to deliver a live stream from an event.

Stephen Streater is the principle progenitor of the Blackbird video codec, which was released in 2004.

On 22 January 2017, Forbidden Technologies released the Blackbird 9 codec.

On 6 March 2018, MSG Networks received a New York chapter Emmy nomination for "Technical Achievement" as follows "MSG Networks Digital Video Editing & Digital Distribution via Blackbird Technology".

On 12 December 2021, EVS announced they had launched a web-based editing application IPD-VIA Create using the Blackbird codec.

=== Impala ===
The Blackbird audio codec is called Impala. Datarate and quality can be varied depending on the use: 10 kbit/s for modem web video and mobile playback, 30 kbit/s for audio only modem playback or broadband playback with video, and 80 kbit/s per channel for editing.

== Blackbird ==
=== Usage ===
The Blackbird platform's functionality makes it suitable for multiple uses in the video editing workflow.

For editors and producers wanting to produce broadcast-quality output, Blackbird provides an environment for the early stages of post-production to happen remotely and cheaply (logging, shot selection, collaborative reviewing, rough cutting and offline editing, for example) and more recently fine cut editing. Blackbird then outputs instructions in standard formats which can be applied to the high-quality master-footage for detailed and high-quality editing prior to broadcast.

Other users want to prepare footage for publishing to lower-quality media - the small screens of mobile phones and video iPods, and to the web where bandwidth restricts the quality of video it is currently practical to output. For these users, all editing can be carried out in Blackbird, before publishing to social media and online video channels, OTT or commercial cloud storage. Video can also be saved in MPEG, Ogg, HTML video, podcasting formats as well as Blackbird's proprietary player.

The platform was reported in July 2012 as being used by NBC in connection with the 2012 Summer Olympics involving integration of the service with YouTube and continues to be used to deliver coverage for sport events such as Formula One, PGA European Tour and the Premier League. §

=== Services ===
The video platform is referred to broadly as Blackbird and marketed as three distinct B2B products:

- Edge
- Ascent
- Forte

All exploit the cloud for delivery. Integrations to third parties provide additional services (for example graphics, CC, transcription) and workflow (such as to other NLE systems).

==== Blackbird Ascent and Blackbird Forte ====
Ascent and Forte enable functionality including: video logging, frame accurate non-linear editing (and multicam support for up to 18 cameras), reviewing, publishing, storyboarding and clipping. Ascent is designed for workflows that require a subset of Forte's features.

==== Blackbird Edge server ====
The Blackbird Edge server is a gateway between content and the Blackbird platform. Clients may elect to use a single physical Edge server per fixed or remote location to scale up operations and improve overall performance (e.g. the time taken to retrieve video for review). Features may vary based on workflow / infrastructure requirement but include:

- Live and non-live Content ingest
- Local caching of video downloads
- Immediate access of video over a Local Area Network (LAN) during upload
- Seamless transfer of video as required between a Blackbird Edge Server and the Blackbird Infrastructure

The product exploits high speed LAN access whilst preserving the principle of access from anywhere. Deployment may be on-premise, on-location, or to public / private cloud. Linux and macOS supported. Logging, editing and reviewing of uploaded material can start as soon as the upload process starts. Files containing video, audio and still may also be picked and uploaded using a web browser for ingest.

==== Blackbird Player ====
The Blackbird Player supports; 'renderless' publishing, multiple layers, own branding, clipping and URL sharing, ability to revoke access and a patented navigation bar. The Blackbird decoder is packaged in libraries for native mobile apps, applets and a pure JavaScript player.

=== Components ===
The Blackbird platform is made up of various components, discussed here.

==== Platform servers ====
The server infrastructure on the Blackbird backbone network (referred to as the cloud) dedicated to Blackbird's customers are distributed over numerous locations and handle around 10,000 hours of new video content each week. These act as one system, increasing both effective capacity and redundancy. As the front end does most of the work during editing, and the upload software does the compression work, the server is lightly loaded and can support many users at the same time. Sites may also attach a server to their own network (Edge) for improved performance/scalability (local ingest and caching to multiply the numbers of users on existing internet connections).

==== User interfaces ====
Functionality to support production workflows, account management and media asset management is accessible from native mobile apps for Android and iOS, web and Java platforms. In 2017 a strategic migration to JavaScript was begun to deliver video playback and video editing capability to web browsers without additional programs or plugins.

===== Account management and MAM =====
Accounts and users are separate. Many individuals may use the same Blackbird account and each user is assigned a role (manager, commenter, reviewer, logger, editor, storyboard). Admin/operational and MAM features include; transfer, search and playback of material, ingest configuration, workflow, account and user settings and usage reports.

===== Security =====
Each standard user account has its own password-protected single sign-on web page. Once logged on, the users have access to their own videos, library material, and any functionality their account supports. Video is not stored on the local computer's hard disc, so when the user closes their web browser, their video is not accessible to subsequent users of the same computer.

===== Internet standards =====
The Blackbird interfaces operate through Internet standards such as HTTP, JavaScript and Java, so can be used even in companies with severe firewalls. If web browsing works, then Blackbird almost always will too.

==== Publishing ====
The Blackbird editing platform supports publishing from original sources up to 4K, to destinations including: social media and online video channels (e.g. YouTube, Facebook, Twitter), OTT and commercial cloud storage (e.g. S3, Azure). Video can be saved to a range of formats (e.g. MPEG, Ogg, XDCAM, EDL, HTML video, FCPX), still images (e.g. JPEG) and the proprietary Blackbird Player.

===== Timecode export =====
Each frame of professionally shot video is tagged with a timecode which identifies it. Combining the timecode information of video handled within Blackbird at browse quality with the original broadcast quality video allows information in Blackbird to be transferred to a broadcast quality version. Videos logged or edited in Blackbird can be exported in the form of a simple EDL or more complex XML for autoconform and offline or online on an Avid or Final Cut Pro system.

===== Broadcast =====
Videos which have been edited within Blackbird can be conformed/rendered to multiple outputs automatically at anything up to 3840p - full Ultra High Definition (UHD). At present 1080p HD accounts for the majority of production workflows. After editing Blackbird uploads the full quality frames used in the finished programme into the Cloud, or alternative eco-systems via Blackbird Edge. The special effects, captions, layers, graphics, cropping and stretching, colour correction and titles are combined at full resolution on a Blackbird Cloud for download, or Edge Server, ready for transmission. Material can be reviewed and edited from anywhere on the web, not just one local source.

==== Systems integration ====
Final programmes can be made, even in High-definition, and sent in broadcast quality efficiently to the broadcaster for transmission without using any third party editing systems. However Blackbird supports integration with third party systems, both in broadcast and elsewhere.

===== EDL/XML =====
Blackbird supports Edit decision list/XML export to industry editing systems such as or Avid / Final Cut Pro. For example, creation of rough cuts in Blackbird can then be reliably conformed on Avid, even when they include clips which the Avid would not normally be able to ingest because of time code breaks and gaps.

===== SDI =====
Serial sigital interface improves Blackbird's integration into the high end broadcast environment. SDI support allows Blackbird to ingest source material in both Standard Definition (SD) and High Definition (HD) resolutions from any professional video source in real time. The SDI video input meets both Phase Alternating Line (PAL) and National Television System Committee (NTSC) standards.

=== Licensing ===
The software is provided as a service (SAAS) which is charged by usage.

== History ==
Blackbird is a development from an editing system made by Eidos Interactive in the 1990s. This history starts from the first public showing of this product, at the International Broadcasting Convention in Europe in 1990.

1990–1999
Date	Version	Platform	Significant features
1990-1999	Edit 1, Edit 2, Optima	Acorn Archimedes 1990-1994; Acorn Risc PC since 1994; StrongARM CPU since 1996	Software codecs; Cheap removable storage; Reliable platform; Quick to learn

2000–2005
Date	Version	Platform	Significant features
February 2000			London float for Forbidden Technologies plc; Shares rise 5000% in first week
February 2001	Java video streaming on website	Java	384x288 pixels; 25 frame/s; 40 kbit/s for talking heads.; Picture quality "cartoon-like"
May 2002	Live video streaming to mobile phone	Java/GPRS	Picture quality poor e.g. monochrome
December 2002	Broadband web streaming	Java	384x288 pixels, 25 frame/s
September 2003	FORlive launched	Linux compression/ Java player	Live video compression; 384x288 pixels, 25 frame/s.
November 2003	FORmobile launched	Symbian Series 60	Mobile phone player application; 160x120 pixels, up to 12.5 frame/s, colour.
September 2004	Forscene launched	Java	Forlive compression; Optima-style editing; Formobile/FORweb publishing
September 2004	IBC TV news use FORscene/FORmobile	Symbian	Branded player
February 2005	GMTV first broadcaster to sign up	Java	International access to GMTV
May 2005	Logging added to Forscene	Java	Java logging, editing and publishing tool
September 2005	Upload over-the-air from mobile phones	Symbian	Video: up to 352x288 pixels; Photographs: phone resolution
September 2005	IBC TV news use FORscene/FORmobile	Symbian	Branded player. The mobile player can be sent from handset to handset for free via Bluetooth, and videos can also be distributed virally via Bluetooth once the Forscene mobile player has been installed. Forbidden has coined the term Viewtooth to describe this process.
September 2005	First broadcast TV series uses Forscene	Channel 5 (UK)	Trust Me - I'm a Holiday Rep

2006–2010
Date	Version	Platform	Significant features
January 2006	New video codec designed for editing	Windows/Mac/Linux compression; Java editing and playback	Blackbird 1 codec
January/February 2006	First prime time TV series uses Forscene	BBC1 (UK)	Super Vets
April 2006	Podcasting released	Video iPod, iTunes	
April/May 2006	British Army uses Forscene mobile player	Symbian mobile phones	Ascent of Everest published on mobiles
May 2006	Video Podcast	Forscene	Videos edited in Forscene can be published directly as video podcasts. These can then be downloaded and viewed in a podcast viewer such as iTunes or on a video iPod.
June 2006	Forscene review	BBC Breakfast, This Morning, Sky News Channel 4 News, Channel 5 News	Broadcasters select Save the Children footage
August 2006	Forscene Ogg support added	Java	Ogg format is supported by Wikipedia for upload of suitable video content
September 2006	Forscene online chat feature added	Java	Share edited videos; Forscene users talk in real time; Contributions (and logging entries) are spell checked (as of Nov 2006)
November 2006	Citizen Journalism	Java / Symbian mobile phones	Third project completed at the World Congress of Science and Factual Producers (WCSFP). Citizen journalism began at the IBC in 2006.
January 2007	Account Management	Web	Interface provides for management of accounts by customers.
February 2007	Forscene Flash support added	Java	Export of video to the Flash format for use with the Adobe Flash Player.
March 2007	Forscene Speed Control	Java	Video and/or audio clips can be edited for slow motion/fast motion style effects.
April 2007	Forscene Fades	Java	Fade up and fade to black with a single drag on the video track.
May 2007	File names/playback	Java	Multi-line file names and three-speed playback control.
June 2007	Security	Java	Log on now supports the secure HTTPS protocol.
August 2007	Images / playback	Java	Images can be integrated directly into the video track and playback can now be viewed at 150% (as well as 100% and 200%).
September 2007	DV	Java	Broadcast quality DV can be output directly from the web interface and effective transfer of DV from the field over standard internet links.
October 2007	Webstart/codec	Java	Webstart can be used to run FORscene, providing access to more memory available, and better performance. The Blackbird codecs deliver better picture quality and lower memory requirements.
December 2007	Audio/graphics/codec/ account management	Java	Simpler stereo audio editing by linking the two audio tracks. Add anti-aliased graphic overlays with transparency levels and fades. Accounts distinguish between departmental and inter-departmental (programme-wide) levels of access.
January 2008	Codec	Java	Blackbird codec upgraded to version 5.
February 2008	Saturation/recompress/ 1GB/audio	Java	Right dragging in the video window adjust saturation levels. Recompress videos to benefit from the latest codec. Modern machines may set a new memory limit to 1GB (reducing network traffic). Improved audio quality.
March 2008	Proxy box/AAF	Java	Boost internet performance for videos captured locally or viewed recently. Support for Avid's AAF files is available, complementing existing support for EDL and FCP (XML).
June 2008	Thumbnails/storyboard	Java	Web published videos have click-through thumbnails. Storyboard offers a simpler editing process with fewer clicks required to use it.
July 2008	AAF/white balance/JPEG export	Java	Additional data added to AAF output to carry more information through to Avid from FORscene. Adjust for colour differences between artificial / daylight conditions. Export a video frame to a JPEG image.
August 2008	Colourful fades	Java	Colour wheel controls fades to/from colours other than the default (black) can pick from colours on the video window.
October 2008	Titles	Java	In addition to imported graphics Forscene's subtitle functions are enhanced with background and font colour, transparency, and size controls.
September 2009	Forscene Server	Server	Sites can multiply the number of users on their existing internet connections whilst preserving all the advantages of internet access from anywhere.
September 2009	Forscene HD	HD	Forscene can now output HD directly providing remote access to video for editing from anywhere in the world, only uploading the fraction of HD that is actually used in the final programme, and ability to use existing computers and internet links.
September 2009	Osprey	Codec	With Osprey codec Forscene enables video editing at broadcast quality locally through a web browser interface and wide-area over the public Internet.
April 2010	Multicam	Java	Multicam can support up to eight concurrent synchronised video streams for logging and editing.

2011–2015
Date	Version	Platform	Significant features
February 2011	Android	Mobile	Client available on the Android platform (consumer edition) including integration with YouTube and Facebook.
February 2014	iOS	Mobile	Forscene client demonstrated on the iOS platform (iPad).
July 2015	eva	iOS	Video social network launched.
August 2015	Blackbird 8	Codec	Release of Blackbird 8 codec.

2015–2019
Date	Version	Platform	Significant features
March 2016	Captevate	JavaScript	Video editor designed for the consumer market launched.
August 2017	VidLib	JavaScript	Conversion of core video library from Java. Downloads and renders edits in real-time. Will initially support two applications; Blackbird Player ("The Player") and Blackbird Clipper (shot selection of live or pre-recorded video).
March 2018	Blackbird 9	Codec	Release of Blackbird 9 codec.
April 2018	Cloud Provider	Azure	Forscene made available on Microsoft's Azure Marketplace cloud computing infrastructure.
May 2018	Ascent/Forte	Integration	AI OS integration annotates content with meta-data and drives workflow.
September 2018	Ascent/Forte	JavaScript	Products Ascent and Forte JavaScript implementations launched. Frame accurate editing can be undertaken in browsers without additional configuration or installation of plugins or applications.
January 2019	Blackbird	Fitness Technology	Peloton select Blackbird to edit on-demand virtual classes.
March 2019	Blackbird	Sports	IMG adopt Blackbird to clip, edit and publish live sports video content.
May 2019	Blackbird	Sports	Deltatre extend use of Blackbird for turnaround of long and short-form game highlights and clips for a range of sports, including rugby, cycling and athletics.
May 2019	Blackbird	Sports	NRL use Blackbird to support packaging short highlights during live NRL matches to be distributed to the league’s global fanbase.
June 2019	Blackbird	Social Media	A+E Networks adopt Blackbird to give executives, producers, editors, marketers and others within the ability to view, edit and enrich video library content.
August 2019	Blackbird	News	TownNews extend use of Blackbird to 39 TV stations.
October 2019	Aperture Solutions Group	Cloud Editing Turnkey System	The US Department of State and its production teams will use Blackbird to rapidly clip, edit and publish news broadcast live to its social channels including Twitter, Facebook and YouTube and to own website and other digital news outlets across the United States.
November 2019	Blackbird	AWS	Blackbird's cloud production and distribution system chosen by Bloomberg Media.
December 2019	Blackbird	Sports	Eleven Sports adopt Blackbird for rapid editing and publishing of sports content to fans online

2020–2024
Date	Version	Platform	Significant features
June 2020	Award	Platform	TV Technology’s Best of Show Digital Video Award
November 2023	Early access	elevate.io	
January 2024	Early signup	elevate.io	
March 2024	Official release	elevate.io	

== See also ==
- Stephen B. Streater
