= Erotic talk =

Practice of using explicit word imagery to heighten a type of arousal

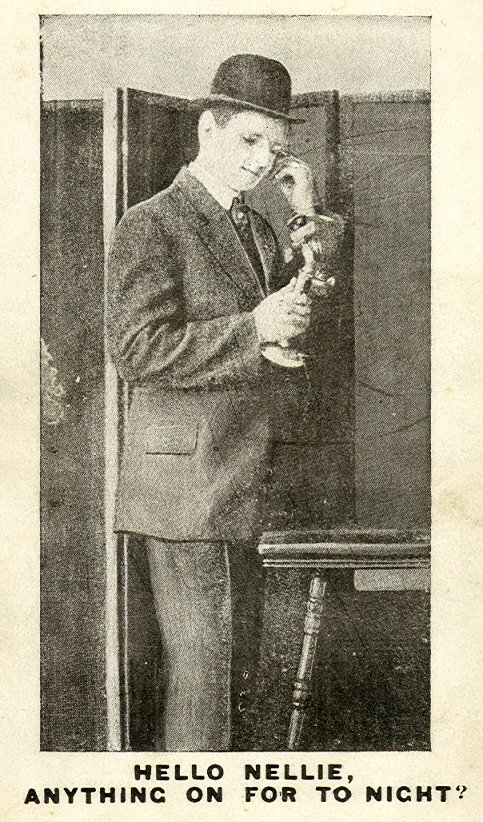
"Saucy" postcard (1905–1915)

Erotic talk, also known as dirty talk, love talk, sexy talk, talking dirty, or naughty talk, is the practice of using explicit word imagery to heighten sexual excitement before and during (or instead of) physical sexual activity. It is commonly a part of foreplay, and can include vivid erotic descriptions, sexual commands and rude words. The intention of erotic talk is generally to generate excitement between one, both or all parties engaged in a sexual interaction, or even to induce orgasm.

Erotic talk can be an important aspect of virtual sex, particularly phone sex and cybersex, in long distance relationships.

== Research ==
The 2013-2014 Great Australian Sex Census found that 62.0% of respondents enjoyed talking during sex, with 41.7% preferring dirty talk, 13.1% preferring sweet talk, and 7.2% preferring stern directions.

A 2022 study found that there are generally few differences between genders regarding the content of erotic talk.

=== Individualistic and mutualistic ===
A 2016 study by Jonason et al. examined eight themes in erotic talk, grouped into two overlapping dimensions—mutualistic (Instructive Statements, Reflexive Calls, Emotional Bonding, and Positive Feedback) and individualistic talk (Sexual Dominance/Submission, Ownership, and Speaking Fantasies); while both dimensions positively correlated with sexual satisfaction, direct comparisons showed a significantly stronger association for mutualistic talk, suggesting it is the primary driver.

== See also ==
- Non-penetrative sex
- Obscene phone call
- Phone sex
- Ribaldry
- Sexting

== Bibliography ==
- Fogarty, Lisa (14 May 2015). "The reason we love dirty talk — finally explained". SheKnows.
- Head, Meredith (18 November 2015). "Hump day: Bridging long distance with communication, vibrating underwear". The Badger Herald.
- Holgate, Emily (30 September 2024). "A sex educator shares her best foreplay ideas". Fashion Journal.
- Jonason, Peter; Betteridge, Gabrielle; Kneebone, Ian (1 January 2016). "An Examination of the Nature of Erotic Talk". Archives of Sexual Behavior. 45 (1). Springer Nature: 21–31. doi:10.1007/s10508-015-0585-2. ISSN 0004-0002.
- Merwin, Kathleen E.; Bergeron, Sophie; Jodouin, Jean-Francois; Mackinnon, Sean P.; Rosen, Natalie O. (1 November 2022). "Few Differences in Sexual Talk by Gender/Sex and Dyad Type: A Retrospective and Daily Diary Study with Couples". Archives of Sexual Behavior. 51 (8). Springer Nature: 3715–3733. doi:10.1007/s10508-022-02363-y. ISSN 0004-0002.
