= Porn 2.0 =

Pornographic websites featuring user-generated content

Porn 2.0 is a term derived from "Web 2.0" that describes pornographic websites featuring amateur pornography and interactive social networking features, such as user-generated categorization, webcam hosting, blogs, and comment sections. This is in contrast to the static content offered by "Web 1.0" pornographic websites. Porn 2.0 websites often have features similar to mainstream Web 2.0 services, including video communities (Meta café, Vimeo, and YouTube), social sites (Tumblr and Twitter), general blogging platforms (Blogger, Daily Booth, and Lookbook.nu) and photo hosting services (Flickr, Photobucket, and Picasa).

== Monetization ==
Unlike Web 2.0 ventures such as Meta Platforms, Myspace, or YouTube, Porn 2.0 was initially unable to find a business strategy that was profitable. Hosting large amount of amateur content resulted in high server costs, there was little or no model income, and services were initially free of charge to users, making advertising income the only source of revenue. By the late 2010s, content subscription service websites such as OnlyFans, were allowing adult-content creators to directly monetize their content.

== Controversies ==
=== Copyright issues ===
One of the central issues of Porn 2.0 is copyright infringement. Porn 2.0 websites have been criticized as potentially harmful to the income streams of the traditional pornography industry such as DVD sales and website subscriptions.

=== Privacy ===
The distribution of sexually explicit images or videos of individuals without their consent is called revenge porn. The practice began in pornographic magazines in the late 20th century. The uploading of such images to the Internet to humiliate and intimidate people has become a significant societal issue in the 21st century. Uploading material without a model's consent is usually prohibited by a website's terms of use, although some sites such as Voyeur Web allow non-consensual photos and move offices frequently to avoid the legal problems this might otherwise entail. Photos and videos of non-consenting models are often obtained through the use of hidden cameras and the sexualization of their nudity. A woman taking a shower at a gym, for example, may be filmed without her knowledge and have the video distributed as pornography.

== Porn 3.0 ==
News media have suggested the possibility of a future Porn 3.0, based on the use of technologies such as 3D stereoscopy, multi-angle DVD, neural impulse actuators, animation using AI technologies, and peripheral controller and devices.
