= XBIZ =

American publisher of business news and business information for the sex industry

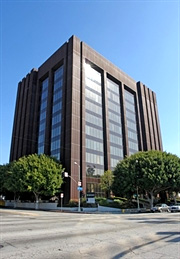
- XBIZ headquarters, Wilshire Boulevard, Los Angeles, California
- Type: Private
- Industry: News media, adult entertainment
- Founded: 1998
- Headquarters: Los Angeles, California, United States
- Area served: Worldwide
- Products: Magazines, news media, wire service, exhibition and industry conference, industry awards show, professional network service, market research
- Website: xbiz.com

XBIZ is an American publisher of business news and information for the sex industry, based in Los Angeles, California.

In addition to its flagship "Xbiz.com" website, XBIZ publishes two monthly trade magazines, hosts winter and summer exhibition and industry conferences, as well as facilitates networking among adult online professionals through a business-to-business (B2B) professional networking service. XBIZ company representatives are frequently cited in mainstream media articles about business trends and practices in the industry.

XBIZ and its affiliated publications and services are operated by Adnet Media, which was founded in 1998 by adult-internet industry veteran Alec Helmy, a founding member of the Association of Sites Advocating Child Protection (ASACP).

== News and information products ==
- XBIZ Digital Edition – XBIZ Digital features digital editions of the XBIZ World Magazine and XBIZ Premiere Magazine business journals, offering online or downloadable versions for offline viewing.
- XBIZ Forum – a three-day business forum and networking event for industry professionals, held at the Hard Rock Hotel and Casino in Paradise, Nevada.
- XBIZ LA Conference – the adult entertainment industry's annual business seminar and trade expo, featuring seminars, workshops, keynote addresses and industry networking events.
- XBIZ Newswire – an adult industry newswire and RSS service
- XBIZ Premiere Magazine (formerly XBIZ Video) – a trade magazine for the adult entertainment industry's retail sector, which reports on the news and developments in the gay, retail, sex toy and video sectors of the adult entertainment industry.
- XBIZ Research – an adult entertainment industry market research program.
- XBIZ World Magazine – a trade magazine for the adult industry's digital media sector, which features Internet and technology news, feature articles, market analysis, trend reports and interviews with online adult industry trendsetters.
- XBIZ.com – an adult industry business news and resource enterprise portal, which features headline news, feature articles, event listings, blogs, message boards, business services and a comprehensive company directory of the adult entertainment industry.
- XBIZ.net – an adult entertainment industry business-to-business professional network service that connects adult entertainment industry professionals with new business opportunities.

== XBIZ Awards ==
XBIZ gives annual industry awards in adult entertainment.

The XBIZ Awards are the largest award ceremony in the B2B sector of the sex industry. The award takes place at the winter conference and is organized by the industry magazine. The first event took place in 2003. The nominations are determined by members of the industry. The jury is provided by employees, colleagues, and partners of XBIZ.
