= Summit (company) =

US-based IT services company

Summit (formerly Deft)
- Formerly: ServerCentral, Deft, Summit Hosting
- Industry: IT services
- Headquarters: Alpharetta, Georgia, United States
- Number of locations: 16
- Key people: Andre Wu (CEO); Jordan Lowe (CSO); Jeff Ash (CFO); Shannon Kaiser (CDO)
- Services: Colocation, Managed Services, Cloud IaaS, Network Services, Cloud Hosting
- Number of employees: 250
- Website: www.summithq.com

Summit (formerly Deft, ServerCentral) is an IT infrastructure provider of colocation, cloud infrastructure, IaaS, DRaaS, network connectivity, managed storage, and managed services in data centers across North America, Europe, Australia, and Asia. Some of the company's customers include CDW, Outbrain, New Relic, Ars Technica, Cars.com, and Shopify. In 2018, Summit (formerly Deft) was named one of the fastest-growing private companies in the United States by Inc. Magazine for the eighth consecutive year. The company was started by Jordan Lowe and Daniel Brosk, who initially provided hosting services under the name ServerCentral.

== History ==
Jordan Lowe and Daniel Brosk began hosting services for friends and local businesses on virtual private servers, growing to over 10,000 accounts under the company name ServerCentral. Growth spiked when Lowe and Brosk began advertising free domain names in exchange for prepaid hosting accounts on a daily deal website. The team switched from manual billing and account creation processes to a lifecycle hosting automation solution from SWsoft, which automated the full customer lifecycle.

In 2002, ServerCentral's headquarters and server operations moved to Chicago, IL.

In 2003, ServerCentral opened data centers in Ashburn, Virginia and San Jose, California. ServerCentral's private 10-Gigabit IP network connected the data centers. That same year, ServerCentral sponsored services for PHP.net, an open-source community for the development of PHP scripting.

In 2004, ServerCentral expanded to Tokyo.

In 2005, ServerCentral rebranded its web hosting division to WingSix, and in 2008, sold it to UK2 Group in order to concentrate on managed data center infrastructure. ServerCentral expanded into Amsterdam and began its collaboration with CacheFly, a high-speed content delivery network (CDN).

In 2006, ServerCentral was one of the first large-scale networks to deploy native IPv6 traffic.

In 2009, ServerCentral expanded its data center footprint into Elk Grove Village, Illinois by signing a long-term leasing agreement with DuPont Fabros Technology (DFT). DFT has an environmentally conscious design, which includes battery-free UPS systems, advanced mechanical automation, and high voltage throughout the power distribution system.

In May 2009, server operations opened in a new Elk Grove Village, IL facility and ServerCentral successfully completed the SAS 70 Type II audit. SingleHop signed a $2.7 million agreement for colocation space and support at ServerCentral's Elk Grove data center. SingleHop signed a 5-year, $7-million contract with ServerCentral again in April 2011 for approximately 80 cabinets.

ServerCentral expanded three times within DFT between 2009 and 2012, bringing its total Elk Grove footprint to approximately 40,000 square feet and 5.5 megawatts of critical load.

In 2010, ServerCentral introduced Dedicated Private Cloud (DPC), a single-tenant infrastructure tuned for an enterprise setup. ServerCentral expanded within its Elk Grove Village, IL facility and made Inc. Magazine's list of the Fastest-Growing Private Companies in America.

In 2011, ServerCentral had 58 employees, $21.2 million in revenue, and 13% annual growth. In June 2012, ServerCentral launched ServerCentral Enterprise Cloud, a public IaaS. ServerCentral completed the Type 2 SSAE 16 SOC 1 audit and climbed Inc. Magazine's list of the Fastest-Growing Private Companies in America.

In 2012, ServerCentral expanded to 40,000 square feet and 5.5 megawatts of critical load in Elk Grove Village, IL.

In 2014, ServerCentral announced DDoS mitigation with Radware. ServerCentral also made the Inc. Magazine Honor Roll for being named to the Inc. 5000 Fastest-Growing Private Companies in America for the fifth consecutive year.

In 2015, ServerCentral expanded its cloud portfolio with multi-tenant, managed VMware.

In 2018, ServerCentral acquired Turing Group and became known as ServerCentral Turing Group (SCTG).

Moving into 2021, ServerCentral Turing Group rebranded as Deft.

In 2024, Deft was acquired by Summit (formerly known as Summit Hosting). The company operated under the name Deft, a Summit company until fully rebranding under the Summit name in early 2025.

== Services ==
=== Data Center Services ===
Summit operates sixteen data centers in which equipment, space, bandwidth, and add-on support are rented to retail customers. Summit is a SOC 2 Type II audited company and PCI-DSS compliant.

=== Managed Services ===
Managed services include dedicated servers, data center migrations, switch and router maintenance, VMware, storage, high-availability load balancers, backup and recovery, remote hands, firewalls, and application, service, and infrastructure monitoring.

=== Disaster Recovery Services ===
Summit provides backup, replication, and single or multi-site disaster recovery as a service.

=== Cloud Services ===
Summit cloud computing services are private, shared, and hybrid IaaS platforms. Colocation customers can directly connect to third-party public cloud providers.

=== Network Services ===
Summit's network services include private IP transit, dedicated data transport, optical fiber, managed network stacks, and native dual-stack (IPv4 and IPv6) service.

== Global IP network ==
Summit operates a 100-Gigabit MPLS backbone with high-capacity bandwidth and interconnectivity between its global data center locations. Summit has deployed native IPv6 traffic on its private network since 2006.
