= Comparison of video hosting services =

The following tables compare general and technical information for a number of current, notable video hosting services. Please see the individual products' articles for further information.

== General information ==
Basic general information about the hosts: creator/company, license/price etc.

Service	Owner	Launched	Content license	Ads	# videos (millions)	Views per day (millions)	Main server location	Prohibits pornography	Multilingual	Ad revenue sharing	Video downloadable	Registration needed to upload
Aparat	Saba Idea	2011	own TOS	Yes	>153	>6	Iran	Yes	Yes	Yes	Yes	Yes
BitChute	Bit Chute Limited	January 2017	own TOS	Yes	Unknown	~0.8	United Kingdom	Yes	No	Yes	some videos downloadable	Yes
Dailymotion	Canal+	March 15, 2005	own TOS	Yes	>36.9	~60	France	Yes	Yes	Yes	No	Yes
Flickr	SmugMug	2004	own TOS	Yes	>1.2	Unknown	United States	Yes	Yes	No	No	Yes
Globo Video	Grupo Globo	2002	Unknown	Yes	>7.76	Unknown	Brazil	Yes	No	Unknown	No	Yes
Godtube	Salem Media Group	2006	Unknown	No	>0.114	Unknown	United States	Yes	No	No	No	Yes
Internet Archive	Internet Archive	May 10, 1996	own TOS	No	>10.2	Unknown	United States	Unknown	Unknown	—N/a	Yes	Yes
MetaCDN	Unimelb; Starfish Ventures	2012	TOS	No	Unknown	Unknown	Australia	Yes	Yes	—N/a	Yes	Yes
Niconico	Kadokawa Dwango	December 12, 2006	own TOS	Yes	>16.5	Unknown	Japan	Yes	Yes	No	No	Yes
Odysee	LBRY	September 2020	own TOS	No	>10	Unknown	United States	Yes	Yes	Yes	Yes	Yes
PeerTube	Framasoft	2018	7 licenses to choose from	Optional	>0.515	>87	France	Optional	Yes	Yes	Yes	Yes
QQ Video	Tencent		own TOS	Yes	>0.864	Unknown	China	Yes	Yes	Yes	Unknown	
Rumble	Rumble Inc.	October 30, 2013	own TOS	Yes (No for Rumble Premium users)	Unknown	Unknown	Canada; United States	Yes	No	Yes	No	Yes
Rutube	Gazprom-Media	2006	own TOS	Yes	>5.82	>1.1	Russian Federation	Yes	No	Yes	Yes	Yes
Tudou	Alibaba Group	April 15, 2005	own TOS	Yes	>0.035	55	China	Yes	Unknown	Unknown	Yes, with official tool only	
Vimeo	Vimeo Holdings	November 2004	own TOS, optional Creative Commons	No	>12.3	Unknown	United States	Yes	Yes	Unknown	some videos downloadable	Yes
Youku	Alibaba Group	2006	own TOS	Yes	>0.665	>150	China	Yes	Yes	Unknown	With official tool only	
YouTube	Alphabet; Google	February 15, 2005	own TOS, optional Creative Commons	Yes (No for YouTube Premium users)	>4,100	7,000	United States	Yes	Yes	Yes	Officially “Selected Videos Only”. However, third-party programs will download videos for free.	Yes

== Supported input file formats ==
All services support the following input file formats:

- Moving Picture Experts Group (.MPG/MPEG-1)
- QuickTime File Format (.MOV)
- Windows Media Video (.WMV)
- Audio Video Interleave (.AVI)
- H.264 MPEG-4/AVC (.MP4)

Unless otherwise indicated, they also support the following input file formats:

- Matroska Multimedia Container (.MKV)
- Theora (.OGV)
- 3rd Generation Partnership Project (.3GP)

Service	MOD	Real	ASF	QT	WebM	Audio	Notes
Aparat	?	?	?	?	Yes	Yes	
Newgrounds					Yes	Audio Portal	FLV, SWF, ZIP, M4V
BitChute					Yes	Yes	
Dailymotion				Yes			?
Flickr	Yes					Yes	No .MKV support
Godtube							
Internet Archive	Yes	Yes	Yes	Yes	Yes	Yes	Any
MetaCDN				Yes	Yes	Yes	
Niconico							DivX, H.263, H.264, FLV, Xvid
PeerTube			Yes	Yes	Yes	Yes	DivX, H.263, H.264, FLV, Xvid, NUT, M4V, ASX, 3G2
Rumble					Yes		No .MKV support
RuTube							FLV
Tudou	?	?	Yes	Yes	Yes		FLV
Vimeo	Yes	Yes	Yes	Yes			3G2, DIVX, DV. Original file can also be downloaded in original format.
Youku	?	?	Yes	Yes			FLV
YouTube	Yes	Yes	Yes	Yes	Yes	Yes	H.263, H.264, FLV
Service	MOD	Real	ASF	QT	WebM	Audio	Notes

== Streaming video technical information ==
Service	Streaming Video Format	Max size (GB)	Max time (min)	Resolution (max)	Video bitrate (kbit/s)	Audio bitrate (kbit/s)	3D capable
BitChute	H.264	2	?	480p Wide SD	< 500	96	No
Dailymotion	Ogg Theora/Vorbis or H.264, Sorenson codec	2	720	4K UHD	?	96~192	No
Facebook Watch	?	4	120	4K UHD	?	?	Yes
Flickr	?	1	3	1080p HD	?	?	No
Godtube	H.264	0.5	—N/a	480p Wide SD	variable	128	No
Internet Archive	Ogg Theora/Vorbis	—N/a	—N/a	—N/a	—N/a	—N/a	?
Newgrounds	N/A	6.3	?	?	variable	320	No
Niconico	H.264, On2 VP6	3	360	4K UHD	unlimited	64~192	?
PeerTube	H.264	8	—N/a	4K UHD	variable	384	No
Rumble	H.264 / AAC LC	15	720	4K UHD	variable, Live max:8000, VOD max:9000	128~224	No
RuTube	H.264	10	300	4K UHD	?	?	No
StreamShark	H.264, MPEG-4 and RTMP	?	?	4K UHD	4096	192	Yes
Vimeo	H.264, AV1	250	24	4K UHD	variable	320	Yes
Youku	On2 VP6	1	unlimited	?	?	?	?
YouTube	H.264, VP9, AV1	256	15 (default), 720 (verified)	8K UHD	variable	64~192	Yes
Service	Streaming Video Format	Max size (GB)	Max time (min)	Resolution	Video bitrate (kbit/s)	Audio bitrate (kbit/s)	3D capable

== Site traffic ==
=== Specifically dedicated video hosting websites ===
Similarweb traffic rank as of 17 July 2023:
Name	Language	Similarweb traffic rank
AcFun	Mandarin	4,675
Aparat	Persian	123
Bigo	English	16,743
Bilibili	Mandarin	30
BitChute	English	4,104
Dailymotion	Multilingual	357
DLive	Multilingual	27,887
FC2 Video	Multilingual	
Huya Live	Mandarin	1,625
Godtube	English	77,477
iQIYI	Mandarin	1,074
Niconico	Japanese	165
Odysee	Multilingual	3,355
Rumble	English	238
Rutube	Russian	542
SchoolTube	English	107,835
Tudou	Mandarin	54,394
Twitch*	Multilingual	49
VBOX7	Bulgarian	19,783
Vimeo	Multilingual	645
Youku	Mandarin	1,433
YouNow	Multilingual	54,020
YouTube	Multilingual	2

* Website predominantly hosts live streaming video.

== See also ==
- Comparison of streaming media software
- Content delivery network
- Streaming television
- Internet Protocol television
- Comparison of music streaming services
- List of streaming media systems
- List of online video platforms
- Multicast
- One-click hosting
- P2PTV
- Protection of Broadcasts and Broadcasting Organizations Treaty
- Push technology
- Streaming media
- Video on demand
- Webcast
