= Innova (video game company) =

Russian video game publisher

- Industry: Video games
- Founded: 2006; 19 years ago
- Founders: Georgy Chumburidze; Armen Gasparyan; Vasily Medvedev; Oleg Sambikin; Gevork Sarkisyan
- Headquarters: Moscow, Russia
- Area served: Russia
- Parent: Enad Global 7 (2021–2022)
- Website: inn.ru

Innova is a Russian video game publisher and localization company headquartered in Moscow. Games published by the company in Russia include Blade & Soul, Aion, Ragnarok Online, Crowfall, Point Blank, RF Online

== History ==
Innova was founded in 2006 by George Chumburidze (a representative of the Italian yacht shipyard Azimut-Benetti), Armen Gasparyan, Vasily Medvedev, Oleg Sambikin, and Gevork Sarkisyan. In 2009, Sambikin and Medvedev exited the business and founded the developer Syncopate. At the time of the company's creation, the online games market in Russia was described as a "gray zone": foreign games were mainly adapted by pirates. The first licensed game released by the company was RF Online by the South Korean company CCR.

In 2010, Innova released a launcher compatible with all games released by the company. In January 2012, this was replaced by the 4game platform. In December 2010, the company launched the online movie theater Ayyo, which provided video-on-demand and download-to-own paid access to films. In the following years, Ayyo showed both profit and loss, and in March 2017, it was frozen in the midst of the general unprofitability of the Russian online cinema market.

== Investments ==
In late 2013, Innova bought the exclusive rights to develop KidZania, a Mexican network of game training parks, in Russia, the United States, Canada, and France. The rights were previously held by a subsidiary of the Kuwaiti company M.H. Alshaya Co. Investments in the project, made by Innova shareholders and partner companies, amounted to $2530 million. In January 2016, the first Russian KidZania opened in the shopping center Aviapark on the Khodynka field in Moscow. At the end of 2016, the investment advisory firm Winter Capital Partners, associated with Russian businessman Vladimir Potanin, acquired 21.5% of Luxembourg's Innova Partners, the operator of KidZania edutainment parks. Investments were aimed at supporting international expansion: the company plans to open parks in 2018-2019 in Los Angeles, Dallas, Chicago, and Paris in 2018-2019.

Also in late 2013, Innova became a co-owner of the Russian digital distribution system for legal video content Pladform, founded by Armen Gulyan. Georgy Chumburidze invited Ivan Tavrin as a co-investor in the project. Innova played a role of the project’s financial investor with a smaller control package, with Armen Gulinyan, the founder of Pladform, remaining responsible for the management. In 2016, Pladform merged with the Russian video hosting Rutube, as a result of which 33.3% of the merged company Ruform transferred to Gazprom-Media holding, and the remaining shares were divided between Pladform co-owners.

The Swedish video game holding company Enad Global 7 wholly acquired Innova in February 25, 2021 with shares worth €109.8 million, the acquisition was finished on March 31, 2021. In 2022, it was sold back to its management for only €32 million as Enad Global 7 decided to exit the Russian market, due to Russia's invasion of Ukraine.

== Games published ==
Year	Title	Developer
2007	RF Online	CCR Inc.
2008	R2 Online	Webzen
2008	Lineage II	NCsoft
2009	Aion	NCsoft
2009	Point Blank	Zepetto
2016	Blade & Soul	NCsoft
2018	Crowfall	ArtCraft
2018	Ragnarok Online	Gravity Inc.
2018	Black Desert Online	Pearl Abyss
2019	Ironsight	Wiple Games
2025	Skyforge	Mail.RU

=== Defunct ===
Year	Title	Developer
2008	Ace Online	MasangSoft
2009	FreeStyle Street Basketball	JC Entertainment
2010	KartRider	Nexon
2010	Crazy Arcade BnB	Nexon
2010	Atlantica Online	NDOORS Corporation
2010	Bomzhi Online	Adventura
2012	АРВ: Reloaded	K2 Network
2012	Shadow Company	Doobic Game Studios
2014	Dragon's Prophet	Runewaker Entertainment
2014	Chaos Fighters	Chengdu Chukong Technology Co
2014	Pocket Fort	Noumena Innovations
2015	Astronest	ANGames
2015	Ballistic	Rumble Entertainment
2015	Earth Keeper	Raw Hand
2015	Gladiators Online: Death Before Dishonor	Dorado Games
2015	Chibi Kings	Ekkorr Games
2015	Tiny Fort	Noumena Innovations
2015	Tank Hero	Clapfoot Inc
2015	Drakensang	Bigpoint
2016	PlanetSide 2	Rogue Planet Games
2017	Kingdom Under Fire II	Blueside
