= Asb Bokhar =

Iranian automotive review and documentary series

- اسب بخار
- Genre: Automotive, Documentary, Talk show
- Country of origin: Iran
- Original language: Persian

Asb Bokhar (Persian: اسب بخار) is an Iranian automotive television and web series focused on reviewing, comparing, and discussing automobiles. The program covers vehicles available in the Iranian market, examining their technical specifications, features, performance, advantages, and disadvantages.

The series also features comparisons between different vehicles, coverage of automotive exhibitions, and reports on developments in the automotive industry. Its video content includes road tests, technical discussions, and off-road driving experiences.

== History ==
Asb Bokhar was created by automotive enthusiasts Mohammad Mehdi Tafazoli. Hamed Zarepoor is the producer and director of the series. According to an interview published by Aparat, the creators initially produced automotive videos independently and uploaded them to the Aparat video-sharing platform.

The first videos featured reviews of cars such as the Lexus GS 250 F Sport. The project subsequently developed into a more regular automotive video production, covering Iranian and imported vehicles.

== Format ==
The program includes several types of automotive content, including:

- Car reviews: Examination of vehicle design, technical specifications, equipment, performance, and driving characteristics.
- Vehicle comparisons: Comparative reviews of cars from different manufacturers and market segments.
- Automotive events: Coverage of car exhibitions and developments in the automotive industry.
- Technical features: Explanations of automotive systems, components, and maintenance-related subjects.
- Driving tests: Road tests and off-road driving experiences.

The program has also covered motorcycles and automotive-related educational topics.

== Distribution ==
Asb Bokhar has distributed its video content through online platforms, including Aparat and its official website. The program has also been made available through Filimo, an Iranian video-on-demand service.
