= Yottaa =

American information technology company

Yottaa, Inc
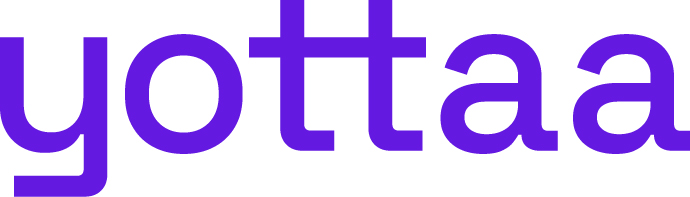
- Company type: Private company
- Website type: software
- Headquarters: Waltham, Massachusetts
- Founders: Coach Wei; Robert Buffone
- Key people: Mike Dickerson, CEO
- Industry: Internet
- Website: www.yottaa.com

Yottaa is a web and mobile optimization services company based in Waltham, Massachusetts. Its main product is a platform that helps with website conversions, as well as performance and security.

== History ==
Yottaa was founded in 2009 in Boston by Coach Wei, a Tsinghua University, and MIT alumnus, and Robert Buffone who studied applied mathematics at SUNY Brockport. Prior to Yottaa, Wei had founded and served as the chairman of Nexaweb. Apart from its office in Boston, Yottaa had opened an office in Beijing in what has been described as an anti-lean startup, due to having a rather big and global team from its inception. Coach Wei served as CEO from 2009 to late 2014 and continues as executive chairman and Robert Buffone serve as the company's CTO respectively. Vick Viren Vaishnavi acts as the CEO since late 2014.

In a series A round in 2010 Yottaa raised $4 million of venture funding from General Catalyst Partners, Stata Venture Partners and Cambridge West Ventures to build its acceleration platform. In 2012 Yottaa named Raymie Stata, a former CTO of Yahoo!, in its board of directors. In a series B round in 2012 the company raised an additional $9 million to expand its platform technology to include monitoring and security features. Following the round, Yottaa won MassTLC's award for Innovative Technology of the Year - Cloud. A further $16 million were raised in 2013, in a round led by Intel Capital, also attracting funding from previous investors to expand sales and marketing operations and attract enterprise customers. From an equity issuance in December 2014, Yottaa received $10.45 million. In early 2015, Yottaa moved its offices from Boston to Waltham, Massachusetts. On May 12, 2022 Yottaa announced a significant growth investment from PSG to help accelerate their growth. Financial terms were not disclosed.

== Services ==
Yottaa has developed a web and mobile optimization platform providing cloud services that improve website speed, and visibility on any device. The company's initial target group were mid-sized enterprises (SMEs), with Yottaa aiming to sell its platform as a software as a service. Yottaa's platform combines an adaptive content delivery network, dynamic site acceleration, web analytics, and internet security. Yottaa deals with the problem of website speed as a software optimization problem, instead of dealing with it as a problem of bits' movement between different places, and does not require any code changes.

Yottaa's platform, named Context Intelligence, identifies the user's location, browser, device, and interaction with web content to sort application content delivery, thus modifying web content to match the end user's browsing context. Context Intelligence comprises several components: AdaptiveCDN is the delivery component, AppSequencing is neutralizing ad-blocking software while ensuring that the websites speed is not reduced, InstantON is an accelerating component, ContextSAFE provides security to the platform, while ImpactAnalytics offers web analytics.
