= Clickability =

Web content management system company

Upland Software
- Type: Public
- Industry: Content Management
- Predecessor: Clickability, Inc.
- Founded: 1999
- Headquarters: San Francisco, California
- Key people: Noah Logan, SVP and General Manager, Clickability
- Products: Web content management system
- Website: www.clickability.com

Clickability, Inc., was a web content management system company. Founded in 1999, it was acquired by Limelight Networks in 2011. Limelight Networks sold Clickability to Upland Software in December 2013.

== History ==
In 1999, John Girard, Jeff Freund, Sean Noonan, and Timur Yarnall started Clickability in San Francisco. After the dot-com bubble burst in 2000, Clickability cut its employee number from 40 to 15.

Clickability raised $7.3 million in 2000. In 2008, it raised $8 million from Shasta Ventures and Convergence Partners. In 2011, Limelight Networks purchased Clickability. In December 2013, Limelight Networks sold Clickability to Upland Software.

== Products ==
Clickability's first product was the "save this" tool, which the company released in late 1999 or early 2000. Other initial products were Internet tools like "email this", "print this", and a "most popular" articles list. Its products were used on hundreds of news websites such as CNN and The Wall Street Journal.

In 2000 and 2001, online advertising was having running into difficulties, so Clickability decided to change its strategy to focus on creating software able to distribute content widely and concurrently to hundreds of websites. The company offered a content management system that allowed customers to administer the material on their websites. According to Information Today, the product had four components. First, Clickability acted as clients' infrastructure as a service by being their web hosting service and content repository. Second, Clickability helped move customers onto its platform. Third, it provided a software as a service by allowing customers to manage the content throughout its creation, review, and distribution. Fourth, it provided an online forum for clients to discuss how to make optimal use of the product. In 2004, InfoWorld's Mike Heck said that Clickability cmPublish Version 4 was a Java-based software that "won't break your budget" and has "essential content creation and administration features".

According to John Wiley & Sons, Clickability in 2009 had 400 million page views every month.
