= Rutube =

Russian video platform

RUTUBE
- Company type: Private
- Website type: Video hosting service
- Available in: Russian
- Founded: 2006
- Headquarters: Moscow, Russia
- Area served: CIS, Worldwide
- Owner: Gazprom-Media
- Founders: Oleg Volobuev, Mikhail Paulkin
- Key people: Sergey Kosinsky (CEO)
- Industry: Internet
- Services: Video sharing (User-generated content), Video streaming
- Employees: Approximately 80
- Website: rutube.ru
- Current status: Active

Rutube (stylized in all caps as RUTUBE) is a Russian video platform that includes a library of licensed content, including movies, TV series, cartoons, and live broadcasts. It also hosts blogs, podcasts, video game streams, and educational content. It is cited as Russia's alternative to YouTube.

Rutube has web, iOS, Android and Smart TV versions. Its audience increased from 7.7 million in January 2022 to over 50 million in March 2022.

== Service model ==
Rutube offers free access to content and gains profit through advertising.

All uploaded content is checked by moderators to block anything that is pornographic, insulting, spam, advocates drug use or violence, or is otherwise abusive and in violation of established rules. The platform uses automatic content identification for prevention of copyright infringement.

Since 2007, the service has supported built-in media players and the creation of whole-scale sections on third-party websites via its API. As part of an affiliate program, Rutube shares income from advertisements with the owners of resources who host the player.

== History ==
=== 2006–2007: incorporation and search for investors ===
Rutube became a video hosting service in 2006. It was launched by Oleg Volobuyev and Mikhail Paulkin—entrepreneurs from Oryol and co-owners of a popular online multiplayer browser game based on Sergey Lukiyanenko's World of Watches saga. In interviews with Business Magazine (Russian: Бизнес-журнал) and iTV, the founders said that they had been working on the video service since 2004–2005. Volobuyev said that the i-vision.ru service, which they had developed, was an ActiveX-based browser plugin, but that ActiveX control elements created a risk of malware infiltration, so the team had to switch to Flash Video. By that time, YouTube, a US video hosting service, had gained popularity, and the Russian developers characterized their service as Russian YouTube.

In 2007, the founders employed Askar Tuganbayev as producer; previously, he had managed Active Time Battle Internet projects and worked as a producer at O2TV and Gameland TV. While staying in Moscow, Tuganbayev built relationships with partners and looked for an investor for the company. Rutube attracted some private investors: Mangrove Capital Partners Venture Fund and Gazprom Media Group. Negotiations with Gazprom Media started in the summer of 2007, and legal arrangements lasted from March 2008 through November 2008. Speculation on the deal's size stirred up public interest. Kommersant claimed that company's valuation ranged from $5 million to $15 million; in an interview with Vedomosti, tech CEOs Dmitry Grishin, German Klimenko, and Viktor Lavrenko each suggested $5 million to $10 million, $3 million to $5 million, and $1 million, respectively. In the summer of 2008, Kommersant stated that the Rutube control stake had been acquired at $15 million in total and that the founders had received motivation payments.

=== 2008–2012: acquisition by Gazprom Media ===
During the arrangements, Tuganbayev had to leave the company due to the expiry of his annual contract. The end of the deal was marked with a major staff reshuffle. Developers and systemic administrators were moved to a separate company. Rutube hired media managers and set up a commercial service, and hired designers and editors, whose responsibility was choosing topics for materials. Mikhail Ilyichev, who had headed the department that managed TNT-owned channels, became Chief Executive Officer. Vladimir Barabanov, former corporate director of the Hearst Shkulev Media Publishing House, was appointed as Chief Development Officer. The changes fit with Rutube's new development strategy as a socially-oriented platform.

In October 2010, the Rutube player was integrated into VKontakte. In April 2011, a section was added to Odnoklassniki with the video platform's content, and ad campaigns were launched in September. In September 2011, paid video content was added: live Russian Football Premier League streams maintained in cooperation with NTV-Plus, a satellite TV provider. In October 2011, the user streaming service, which had functioned since the launch of the platform, stopped working.

In March 2011, under the supervision of the Rutube managerial staff, the Now.ru online movie theater was launched in the service's technical base. The library included licensed content provided by Sony Pictures, The Walt Disney Company, Warner Bros., Playboy, Lionsgate, BBC, MTV, and Nickelodeon.

=== 2012–2015: redesign and development ===
In the summer of 2012, Gazprom Media changed the service's management. At the same time, changes were made to the design, development strategy, and marketing strategy. In the new version, Rutube offered not only its own videos, but also videos sourced from YouTube, Facebook, and Vimeo. CEO Mikhail Ilyichev was replaced by Now.ru Technical Manager Elena Sakharova, who had managed the development of Gazprom Media's IT broadcast platforms. The service's content management policy shifted from user-generated content to editor-managed professional content. In August 2012, Rutube displayed French movies, short movies, and advertisement videos which received Cannes Lions awards.

In 2014, the company planned to change its stockholder structure as part of a deal between Rostelecom and Gazprom Media. It was expected that Rutube would merge, under a single brand, with the TV-oriented Zoomby.ru and the movie-oriented Now.ru. The deal was approved by the Federal Antimonopoly Service, but it was canceled after the Gazprom Media reshuffle.

In February 2015, Rutube partnered with Sputnik Deti (Russian: Спутник.Дети), a search engine for children, presenting videos from the secure children's section in search results. In June, Rutube's content appeared in a separate section of V Metro, as part of Rutube's cooperation with the MaximaTelecom Wi-Fi network of the Moscow Metro. In July, Vadim Fetotov, former CEO of Groupon in Russia and Ukraine, became CEO of Rutube and took control of Gazprom Media assets. In October, Rutube content appeared on the updated Kinopoisk service.

=== 2016–2019: merger with Pladform ===
In February 2016, it was announced that Rutube was merging with Pladform, Runet's largest legal content distributor. In May 2016, the merger was completed. Gazprom Media passed over to the new company—Ruform—the Rutube brand and the rutube.ru website, while reserving the content delivery network and ZAO Rutube transcoding resources. In the new group, Gazprom Media holds a 33.3% stock, and the rest of it belongs to previous Pladform stockholders—Armen Gulinyan, Ivan Tavrin, and Innova. Armen Gulinyan, founder and CEO of Pladform, took the position of CEO at Ruform, and head of a digital subholding at Gazprom Media—Vadim Fedotov—became chairman of the board of directors. In January 2019, Ivan Tavrin and his partners sold 67% of the OOO Ruform Stock to Alexander Karmanov—the main owner of Eurasian Pipeline Consortium. Roman Maximov was appointed as CEO. Pladform ceased independent operation in April 2022.

=== 2019–2020: LIST platform ===
Since late 2019, Rutube worked as part of the LIST platform, which provided free access to content on the condition that a user watched ads and answered two questions: one concerning promo content and the other—the audience's interests, to investigate users' needs.

The system relied on free access to the content at the cost of having to watch ads carefully and to the end.

All videos hosted by the service would be available after a free sign-up via phone number.

The service would host movies and series rather than user-generated content. All projects by Premier, TNT, Pyatnitsa!, and other major Russian TV channels were available for free.

The "closed" approach resulted in the deletion of the Rutube player from major platforms like VKontakte and Odnoklassniki.

=== 2020–present: merger with Gazprom Media ===
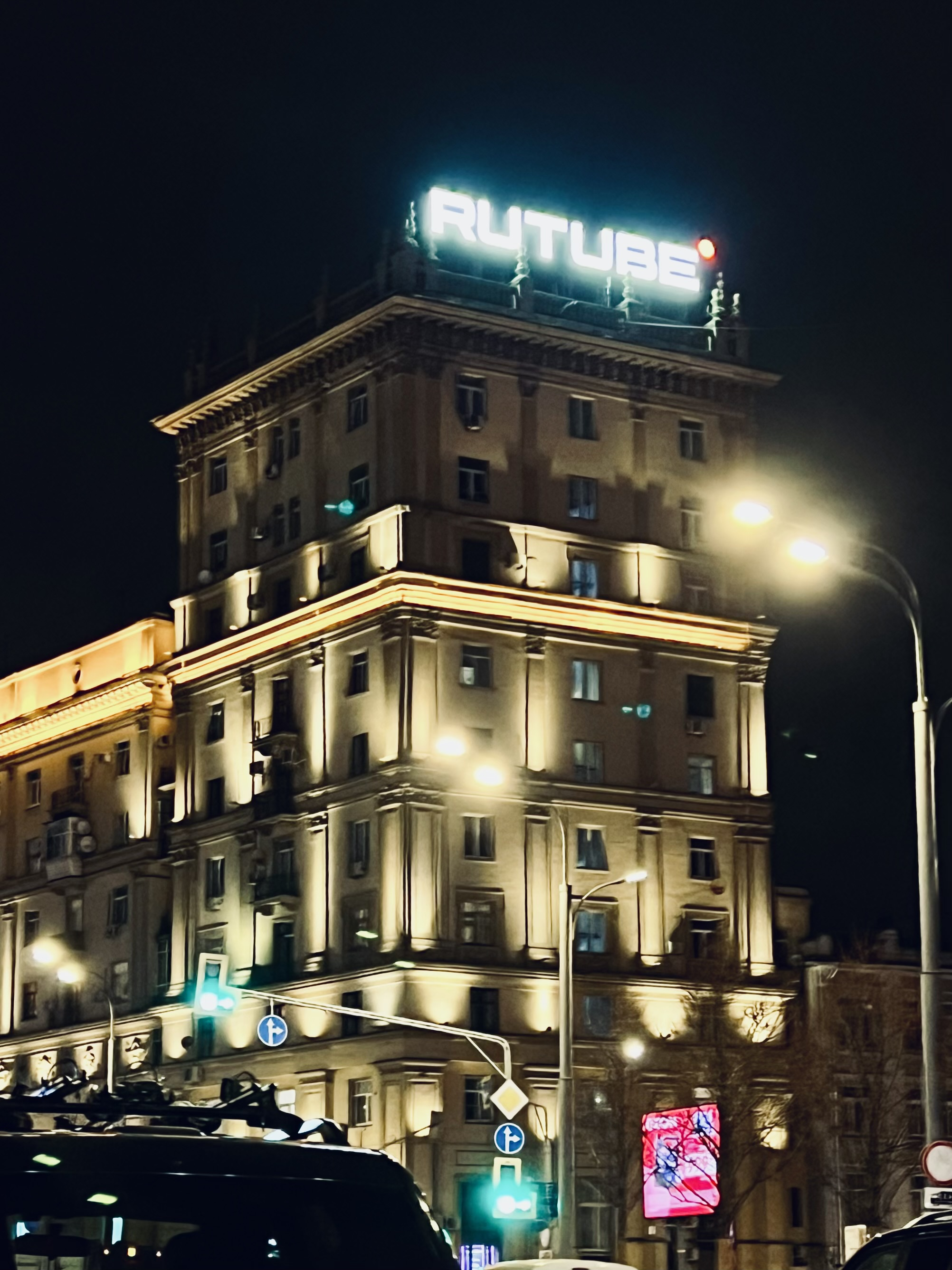
Rutube LED banner board in Moscow (2024)

In late 2020, news emerged that Gazprom Media planned to purchase Rutube's controlling stock and monopolize ownership of the video-hosting platform. On December 28, 2020, the information proved correct: Gazprom Media became the sole owner of OOO Ruform (a company that includes Rutube and Pladform) and was planning to carry on with the team. The size of the deal became public.

In late December 2020, Rutube canceled mandatory sign-up for those planning to confine their activities to watching videos. Users wanting to comment or post their own videos would need to sign up via email, not via phone number. Also, Rutube switched back to the classic monetization model - relying on free video streaming with mandatory ad-viewing. The polling system was canceled.

In April, Rutube was relaunched. The changes influenced the web version: which featured a completely new interface, intuitive navigation, a new color palette, and new content-management tools.

The site added new sections: "Podcasts", "Tuition", and "Goods". Also, new monetization tools appeared: donations, subscriptions, and live online sales.

In August 2021, Alexey Nazarov, former ER-Telecom top manager, replaced Roman Maximov as the new CEO of Rutube. Nazarov, however, left barely six months later, in March 2022, to be replaced by Kaspersky Lab veteran Alexander Moiseev, who in turn was replaced by Sergey Kosinsky only a year later.

A large-scale cyberattack forced the video platform offline, hours before the scheduled streaming of the Moscow 9 May 2022 Victory Day parade. It turned out that the platform security audit was outsourced to a Ukrainian company, which used a purposely left backdoor to wipe out most of its content and install pro-Ukrainian content.

In July 2022, two Russian pranksters, Vovan and Lexus, arranged prank interviews, luring a number of European politicians to speak with their impersonation of the mayor of Kyiv, Vitali Klitschko. Via Zoom, they used old videos of Klitschko to speak with Berlin mayor Franziska Giffey, EU-commissioner Ylva Johansson, and other politicians. Vovan and Lexus claimed in an interview with the German RBB that Rutube financed them.

In August 2024, the RuTube app was removed from the App Store. The video service explained this by sanctions from Apple and promised to fight for its restoration.

In August of the same year, Rutube launched a function for transferring video content from YouTube, access to which has been difficult in Russia for several weeks. Up to two thousand videos can be transferred in one session, the maximum size of one is 25 gigabytes, the maximum duration is 5 hours.

On September 11, 2024, Rutube introduced the advertising platform Rutube Media. The platform is based on its own player, which is integrated into various websites.

On October 3, 2024, Rutube was blocked in Moldova.

== See also ==
- Comparison of video hosting services
