= Cdnjs =

Content delivery network for web resources

cdnjs
- Developers: Ryan Kirkman, Thomas Davis, Matt Cowley, Sven Sauleau, Tyler Caslin
- Initial release: February 25, 2011; 15 years ago
- Written in: JavaScript, Go
- Operating system: Cross-platform
- Type: FOSS CDN
- License: MIT License
- Website: cdnjs.com
- Repository: Cdnjs on GitHub

cdnjs is a free and open-source software (FOSS) content delivery network (CDN) hosted by Cloudflare. As of May 2021, it serves 4,013 JavaScript and CSS libraries, which are stored publicly on GitHub. It is included in millions of websites, or 12.4% of the websites on the Internet, making it the second most popular CDN for JavaScript.

== History ==
In January 2011, Ryan Kirkman and Thomas Davis created the service, launching it on GitHub on February 25, 2011. It initially served content through Amazon CloudFront. On June 15, 2011, cdnjs partnered with Cloudflare, who provided the CDN and subdomain cdnjs.cloudflare.com for the project.

On November 1, 2019, the founders turned over control of cdnjs to Cloudflare, citing "technical and commercial reasons." According to the community maintainers, the project was difficult to manage because of limited access to the GitHub repository, inactive founders, and a small budget. It is estimated the annual budget at the time was approximately $50/yr.

== Operation ==
The service is maintained by the community and Cloudflare. As of May 2021, there have been 1,443 contributors to the main GitHub repository, and 88 contributors to the newer package configuration GitHub repository.

It is also sponsored by DigitalOcean, Algolia, Heroku, Atlassian, Sentry, and Lean20.

There is a public JSON API for developers to query cdnjs library metadata.

Resources on cdnjs can be loaded using a number of connection protocols – HTTP/2, HTTP, HTTPS or SPDY.

The cdnjs.cloudflare.com domain is part of the HSTS preload list.

There exist websites that host clones of cdnjs libraries on their own servers:

- Wikimedia Tool Labs
- ByteDance
