= THG Ingenuity Cloud Services =

Internet services provider

- Formerly: UK2 Group
- Founded: 1998; 28 years ago
- Founder: Bo Bendtsen
- Headquarters: United Kingdom
- Number of locations: 35+ data centres (2023)
- Area served: Worldwide
- Services: Cloud computing; Web hosting; Domain Registrar; SSL Certificate; Virtual private server
- Owner: THG Ingenuity
- Number of employees: 1,000+ IT engineers (2023)
- Website: ingenuitycloudservices.com

THG Ingenuity Cloud Services, formerly UK2 Group, is a global provider of internet services. It forms part of THG Ingenuity, an e-commerce services platform. Its services include web hosting, virtual private servers, domain name registration, management, dedicated servers and a content delivery network.

== History ==
=== 1998–2010 ===
The group's first brand, UK2.Net, was launched in the UK by Danish entrepreneur Bo Bendtsen in October 1998 as a low-cost, no-frills provider of Internet domain names. By 2000, it had become the UK's largest web hosting company, with an estimated 435,000 customers.

Bendtsen retired from the company in 2002 but maintained a controlling stake. Following his departure, the company struggled to maintain its market position under chief executive Erik Anderson. Over the next three years, its customer base shrank by around 50%. In 2006 Anderson stepped down, and the group appointed Ditlev Bredahl as chief executive.

The next three years were marked by a series of strategic acquisitions, within and outside the UK. In 2006, UK2 Group acquired UK domain name business Another.com. In 2007, it purchased the reseller business of US web hosting company Stargate, which it integrated and rebranded as Resell.biz. It also acquired Stargate's shared hosting business, which was integrated and rebranded as US2.net. In 2007 it also purchased US shared hosting and VPS provider midPhase Services, including the company's ANHosting.com and Autica.com brands.

In 2008, it acquired ICANN-accredited domain registrar Naming Web, and US-based web-hosting brand WingSix from ServerCentral. It also acquired Australian community-focused web-hosting provider Dotable, US-based shared and dedicated hosting provider WestHost, including its data center in Salt Lake City, Utah, and UK-based dedicated and managed hosting company Virtual Internet.

That year, it also created the 10TB.com brand, partnering with cloud provider SoftLayer Technologies to offer a global, high-bandwidth dedicated web-hosting service. As SoftLayer's network capacity expanded, UK2 upgraded the service and in March 2010 relaunched it as 100TB.com to reflect the increased bandwidth.

By 2009, the group had successfully rebuilt its market reputation and returned to financial health. Staff numbers had grown from 30 to more than 200. In February that year, it was ranked the second-most reliable hosting company in the world by hosting market analyst Netcraft.

UK2 Group continued to tighten operations in the wake of the Great Recession and, in May 2009, the company closed its overseas call centres, eliminating around 40 jobs in India and 35 in Ukraine in favour of a smaller support team. At the same time, the group streamlined its executive management team.

In 2010, the group launched another new brand, VPS.Net, to cater for the anticipated growth in demand for virtual private servers.

=== 2011–2016 ===
In April 2011, Lloyds Development Capital (LDC) - a subsidiary of Lloyds Banking Group - acquired a majority stake in UK2 Group for £47 million (about US$77 million), as part of a management buyout. At this time Bredahl departed, to become CEO of another LDC-backed business, OnApp, and Phil Male, previously chief strategy officer at Cable and Wireless, joined as the new CEO.

In 2011, the group announced the launch of HostPuru - a hosting brand targeting the Latin American market and in 2012 it announced it was launching a virtual private network service, VPNHQ.

Current list of brands in 2018 with reviews on each one is maintained on whtop.com.

The group has expanded into new markets such as Latin America, and introduced a series of new brands and services in a bid to meet the growing demand for hosting and cloud computing services among business and individuals. By 2011, the group was ranked 45 on the list fastest-growing private technology companies in Britain, but in 2012, number 53.

=== 2017–2025 ===
In May 2017, the company was acquired by THG plc for £58 million. It was rebranded as THG Ingenuity Cloud Services and formed the cloud services arm of THG Ingenuity, an e-commerce platform. In January 2025, THG plc demerged its technology and logistics arm, THG Ingenuity, into a privately owned, stand-alone business.

=== 2026–present ===
In February 2026, Your.Online acquired the UK2, Midphase, Westhost and Resell.biz brands from THG Ingenuity, while the VPS.net and Ingenuity Cloud Services brands remained with THG Ingenuity.

In March 2026, Ingenuity Cloud Services announced that all bare metal services would be terminated on 31 May 2026.
