= Sergey Aslanyan (entrepreneur) =

Russian entrepreneur, businessman and executive manager (born 1973)

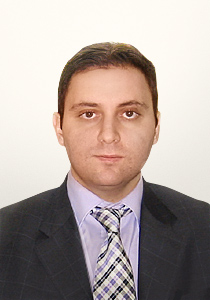
- Born: Sergey Gareginovich Aslanyan; 18 September 1973 (age 52); Yerevan, Soviet Union
- Education: Moscow State University (1996)
- Occupations: Chairman, MaximaTelecom

Sergey Aslanyan (Russian: Сергей Гарегинович Асланян; born September 18, 1973, in Yerevan, USSR) is a Russian businessman and executive manager. He is the founder and Chairman of the Board at MaximaTelecom.

== Biography ==
Sergey Aslanyan was born in Yerevan, Armenia, graduated from the Faculty of Computational Mathematics and Cybernetics at Lomonosov Moscow State University. In 1996, Aslanyan received a degree in Applied Mathematics.

Aslanyan started his career in 1997 as a senior consultant at the auditing company Coopers & Lybrand, which soon merged with Price Waterhouse and was titled PricewaterhouseCoopers. In 2001, he joined TNK-BP Management as deputy head of the information technology unit.

In December 2003, Aslanyan was invited to join Mobile TeleSystems as Vice President of Information Technology – this position was created specially for him. In July 2006, he was appointed as Vice President of Engineering and Information Technology. He supervised the transition of the telecommunications operator to a new billing system, the implementation of Oracle ERP system and workflow automation system, and he was responsible for integrating companies acquired by MTS network.

In October 2007 Aslanyan became president of the Sitronics group, which belonged to investment holding JSFC Sistema just as Mobile TeleSystems. Aslanyan presented a new strategy of the group company development, aimed at reducing non-profitable areas (e.g. consumer electronics), funding priority scientific developments of the state (e.g., microelectronics) and manufacture optimization. From 2007 to 2012 Aslanyan was a minority shareholder of Sitronics with a share of 0.687% (up to 2010 – 0.25%). In January 2013, he left the company.

In January 2013, together with a group of private investors Aslanyan acquired the company MaximaTelecom which was owned by the JSFC Sistema's systems integrator NVision Group and became the head of its board of directors. In July 2013 MaximaTelecom took part in the auction of the Moscow Metro for the right of creating and operating Wi-Fi network in the subway trains and signed a contract as the only bidder. Investments in the project amounted to more than 2 billion rubles. Since 1 December 2014, Free Wi-Fi has been available on all subway lines.

== Awards and recognition ==
Aslanyan twice won the IT leader awards in 2004 and 2006 in the categories telecommunication companies and mobile operators, respectively. He is a winner of Aristos award, which was established by Russian Association of Managers and the publishing house Kommersant in the category IT-director (2006). In 2009, his name was included in the biographical reference book Armenian Business Elite of Russia, published by the scientific and educational foundation Erevank. In May 2011, Aslanyan was noted among the best IT managers of the Russian Internet by the internet periodical CNews. In 2011, he received the highest index of personal reputation among top managers of telecommunication companies in the ranking developed by TASS-Telecom. In September 2012 the newspaper Kommersant put Aslanyan in top-10 list of the best managers in the field of information technology in the XIII annual ranking of Russian top managers.

== Personal life ==
Sergey Aslanyan enjoys playing tennis and squash.
