= Pladform =

- Company type: Private
- Industry: Entertainment
- Founded: 2012; 14 years ago
- Defunct: yes
- Headquarters: Moscow, Russia
- Area served: Russia
- Products: streaming media, video on demand
- Website: https://pladform.ru/

Pladform was a Russian digital distribution system for licensed video content. It has been a part of the unified company Ruform since 2016, which also includes video hosting Rutube, which eventually absorbed Pladform in April 2022.

== Company ==
The development of the system began in 2012 within the framework of the company Pladform. It was founded by Armen Gulinyan — in the past he was a co-founder of Pirogov's Bureau and an employee of the media holding company Yellow, Black and White, which became the first investor of the new company. In July–August 2013, the company established a partnership with the reseller of Gazprom-Media Digital and launched a closed beta testing of the platform. Attempts to attract additional investment from companies of advertising market weren't unsuccessful, so the company was growing from main activities revenues.

In late 2013, the company was invested by the Russian localizer and publisher of online games Innova, and its founder Georgy Chumburidze invited another investor, Ivan Tavrin, to the Pladform. According to Gulinyan, at the beginning of 2015 the total investment in the project amounted to about 20 million rubles, and none of the company's co-owners held a controlling ownership interest, so the company's management remained in the hands of the CEO.

In 2015, Yellow, Black and White withdrew their capital from Pladform. In 2016 it became known about the merger of Pladform and the managing company of Russian video hosting Rutube, owned by Gazprom-Media Holding. In the merged company Ruform the holding got 33.3%, and 66.6% were divided between the owners of Pladform. Gulinyan was appointed the general director of the merged company. As a result of the merger, Gazprom-Media Holding got access to the content distribution network, and Pladform — to the licensed content of the channels included in the structure of Gazprom-Media. B2B solutions for rights holders and promotional tools continued to operate under the Pladform brand, and B2C platform kept the name Rutube. After the merger, Rutube increased its share of views in Runet from 15% to 40% and made it to the top of the app rankings in Google Play and AppStore.

== Model of work ==
Pladform acted as an intermediary between rights-holders, advertisers, and websites, providing storage of video on their own servers and broadcasting via their own media player with video advertising support. Rights-holders could upload their own content onto websites which were connected to Pladform, and search for any content which was previously uploaded violating the copyright. From a legal point of view, Pladform was providing copyright clearance. Pladform profits from promotional materials included in the video: 75% of the revenue from the advertising goes to the content owner, 25% is shared between the platform and the website that embeds the media player.

In 2015 Pladform had 5.95 billion views. By the beginning of 2016, Pladform worked with 130 Russian and foreign copyright holders, including Yellow, Black and White; Alexander Maslyakov and Company (AMiK); Red Media; Gazgolder; Krasny Kvadrat; and CTV. The company's player was installed on almost 2.5 thousand websites, including video hosting sites, news and entertainment sites and social networks, including VKontakte, Odnoklassniki and My World@Mail.Ru (they provided about 40% of the views). It is also built into mobile applications and works in Smart TV systems. In the Pladform library there are about 1 million units of licensed content. In the summer of 2017 VKontakte opened a content exchange market focused on administrators of public pages of the social network and working on the basis of the combined catalog of Pladform and Rutube.

According to Digital Video IAB Russia, as of September 2017, Pladform was the second-largest player in the Russian online video market, second only to YouTube (21.5 million and 26.8 million people, respectively).

== Awards ==
- 2014 — Technology and Innovation Runet Award.

== Links ==
- Official website
