= Edgio =

American information technology company

Edgio, Inc.
- Formerly: Limelight Networks, Inc. (2001–2022)
- Type: Public
- Traded as: Nasdaq: EGIO
- Industry: Content delivery
- Predecessor: Edgecast
- Founded: 2001; 25 years ago (as Limelight Networks); June 16, 2022; 4 years ago (as Edgio)
- Founders: Nathan F. Raciborski, Michael M. Gordon, Allan M. Kaplan, William H. Rinehart
- Defunct: January 15, 2025; 21 months ago
- Headquarters: Tempe, Arizona
- Key people: Todd Hinders (CEO, Jan 2, 2024)
- Revenue: US$ 230.2 million (2020)
- Number of employees: Approx 610
- ASN: 22822
- Website: edg.io

Edgio, Inc., formerly Limelight Networks, was an American company that provided a content delivery network (CDN) service used for delivery of digital media content and software.

Following a 2022 acquisition of Edgecast, the company re-branded as Edgio, and included edge computing and cybersecurity services, such as DDoS mitigation.

As of January 2023, the company's network had more than 300 points of presence and delivered more than 250 terabits per second of egress capacity across the globe.

== Company history ==
Limelight Networks logo

Edgio was founded in 2001 in Tempe, Arizona as Limelight Networks, a provider of content delivery network services. The company's Limelight Orchestrate Platform delivered live and on-demand video, as well as online content to any connected device anywhere in the world.

In July 2006, the company closed a $130 million equity financing round led by Goldman Sachs Alternatives. Limelight Networks later raised $240 million in an initial public offering in June 2007, opening on Nasdaq with the symbol LLNW and selling 16 million shares at $15. In April 2008, company founder Michael Gordon was recognized as a "Streaming Media All-Star" by StreamingMedia Magazine for his contributions to the industry.

In January 2021, Limelight Networks and its board of directors announced that Bob Lyons had been named as the new president and CEO of Limelight Networks, Inc. and was to join the company and the board of directors effective February 1, 2021. Lyons had formerly been the CEO of Alert Logic.

In September 2021, Limelight Networks acquired Moov Corporation, which did business as Layer0. The acquisition of Layer0 added website orchestration and workflow products, now part of Edgio's Applications Suite.

On June 16, 2022, Limelight Networks completed the acquisition of Edgecast from Yahoo! Inc. and rebranded itself to Edgio. The acquisition of Edgecast expanded the reach of Edgio's global delivery network and added enterprise-class security solutions to the product portfolio. Additionally, Edgecast brought the Uplynk product, a video workflow and orchestration tool for the streaming of live and on-demand events. Following this acquisition, Edgio developed two distinct products - its Applications suite, consisting of website orchestration and cybersecurity solutions; and its Media suite, consisting of media delivery on its global edge network and video streaming solutions.

On April 25, 2023, Edgio, its Chief Executive Bob Lyons, former CFO Dan Boncel, and current CFO Stephen Cumming were sued in a class action lawsuit for violating federal securities law by overstating the growth of the company's new Edge products. Edgio was dismissed from the lawsuit on March 17, 2025, due to its bankruptcy and the remaining defendants settled the lawsuit on June 6, 2026.

On September 9, 2024, Edgio filed for Chapter 11 bankruptcy protection. The company sold its assets to Lynrock Lake LP, a private equity firm, for around $110 million. Akamai Technologies purchased Edgio's customer contracts and patents among assets.

== Technologies ==
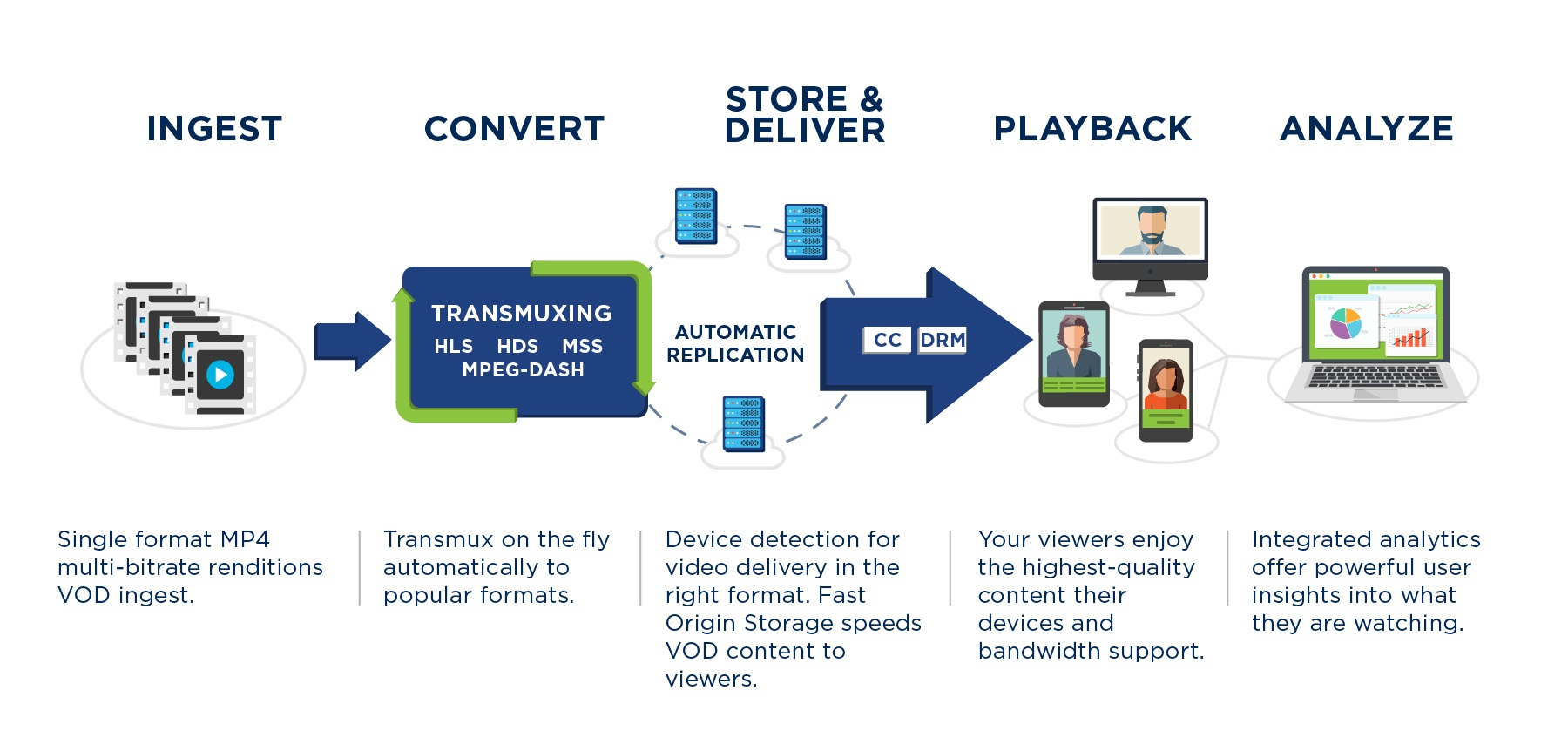
Simplified Video on Demand Model

Edgio operates its own private network with more than 250 terabits per second of global egress capacity. The network consists of dense clusters of specially configured servers in more than 300 delivery locations (points-of-presence) which are connected through the company's global network and connected to more than 1000 Internet service provider (ISP) networks. Edgio caches web content for its customers in multiple delivery locations around the world, serving it to users from the fastest location. A private fiber network backbone between its delivery locations allows cache-fill traffic and dynamic content to bypass the public internet and improve the delivery speed of content. This architecture is managed by proprietary software that increases the speed of delivery with fewer cache misses and can scale to handle surges in end-user demand. Edgio networks mainly use FreeBSD as the operating system on their infrastructures.

=== The Edgio Platform ===
The Edgio Platform is composed of services including content delivery, video packaging and content management, web acceleration, cloud security (including DDoS and WAF protection), and cloud storage.

== Customers ==
In August 2007, the company announced a technology and services agreement with Microsoft under which Limelight will help improve the performance, scalability, and reliability of Internet delivery of media content and online services, including video, music, games, software, and social media across Microsoft's global Internet properties. In March 2008, the company was the infrastructure provider for the webcast of Oprah's "A New Earth" classroom series featuring author Eckhart Tolle. The live event drew over 800,000 users. The server crashed during the event because of an error in the programming code; the crash was widely misreported as a failure of network infrastructure.

In May 2008, NBC announced that the company would be the content delivery network for the 2008 Summer Olympics webcast on NBCOlympics.com. The company delivered "more than 50 million unique visitors, resulting in 1.3 billion page views, 70 million video streams, and 600 million minutes of video watched" for NBCOlympics.com, using Microsoft Silverlight technology.

In June 2008, the company was the primary source of content delivery services for the debut of Disney's Camp Rock. The 24-hour online event saw more than 863,000 total plays for the movie. In January 2009, the company delivered the inauguration of U.S. President Barack Obama to 2.5 million Internet viewers around the world, resulting in more than 9 million simultaneous multimedia streams overall flowing through the company's network. Later that March, the company was the exclusive mobile content delivery provider for CBS's coverage of the 2009 NCAA tournament. Limelight Networks's technology was used to deliver coverage of the college basketball games to the iPhone.

In 2012, Limelight helped deliver sporting events like the Wimbledon Tennis Championships, the Indian Cricket League, the European Championship and the RBS Six Nations' rugby championships. Limelight also helped several broadcasters deliver the 2012 Summer Games.

The Described and Captioned Media Program (a non-profit educational organization) uses Edgio to accelerate distribution by caching videos on servers as close to the user as possible.

In February 2017, Limelight was one of three content delivery networks to stream the Super Bowl.

== Acquisitions ==
- Kiptronic Inc., a privately held provider of device-optimized content delivery solutions and dynamic advertising insertion. (May 2009) It exists today as the Orchestrate Video offering.
- EyeWonder, Inc., a privately held provider of rich media advertising (or "interactive digital advertising"), bought for $110 million. (April 2010) As part of the purchase of EyeWonder, Limelight Networks, Inc. also purchased chors GmbH. Both of these businesses, which consisted of the EyeWonder business unit, were later sold to DG.
- Delve Networks, Inc., a privately held provider of cloud-based video publishing and analytics services. (August 2010) It exists today as the Orchestrate Video offering.
- AcceloWeb, bought for $20 million. (May 2011) It exists today as the Orchestrate Performance offering.
- Clickability, a web content management system company, bought for $10 million. (May 2011) On December 23, 2013, Upland Software announced that they had acquired Clickability from Limelight.
- Moov Corporation, doing business as Layer0, a provider of sub-second web apps and APIs through an all-in-one Jamstack platform. (September 2021)
- Edgecast from Yahoo! Inc., bought for approximately $300 million. (June 2022)

== Patent lawsuits ==
In June 2006, Limelight Networks was sued by Akamai Technologies and the Massachusetts Institute of Technology over alleged patent infringement. In April 2009, the District Court for the District of Massachusetts ruled that Limelight Networks did not infringe, overturning the February 2008 finding of a Boston jury. Similarly, in December 2007, Limelight Networks was sued by Level 3 Communications over alleged intellectual property and patent infringement. In January 2009, a jury ruled that Limelight Networks did not infringe. Akamai Technologies appealed part of the decision. On April 20, 2011, the United States Court of Appeals for the Federal Circuit granted the petition by Akamai Technologies for rehearing en banc its appeal in Akamai Technologies, Inc. v. Limelight Networks, Inc. The order vacated the earlier opinion of December 20, 2010. The order includes a request to file new briefs addressing the question about how liable each party is in a case of joint infringement.

On August 31, 2012, the Court of Appeals for the Federal Circuit delivered its verdict on the case. The Court of Appeals stated that the trial court determined that Limelight did not directly infringe on Akamai's patent. A slim majority in the three-way divided opinion also announced a revised legal theory of induced infringement, remanding the case to the trial court. This gave Akamai an opportunity for a new trial to attempt to prove induced infringement. On December 28, 2012, Limelight filed a petition asking the Supreme Court to review the decision of the Federal Circuit regarding the standard for induced infringement in cases where multiple parties may perform various steps of a patented claim. Akamai filed a cross petition asking the Court to also review the standard for direct infringement in those cases. On June 24, 2013, the Supreme Court asked the Solicitor General to comment on the petition for certiorari. In June 2014, the Supreme Court reached a unanimous decision rejecting Akamai's claim of "induced infringement".

On July 1, 2016, it was announced that the Massachusetts District Court entered the final judgment in the case, with Limelight paying $51M in total damages to Akamai (to be reflected in Limelight's 2016 Q2 earnings).

== See also ==
- Streaming media
