= MetaCDN =

Content delivery network

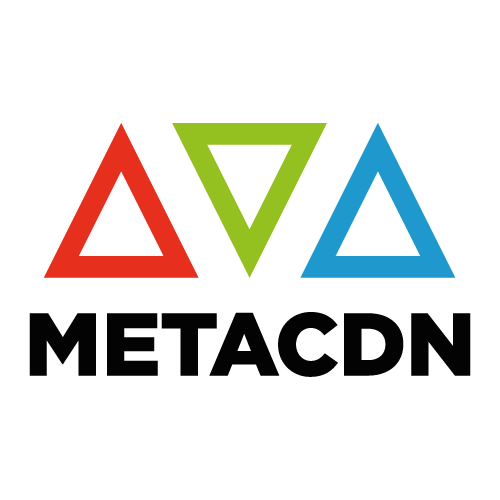
- Company type: Proprietary company
- Industry: Internet
- Founded: 15 Feb 2011
- Headquarters: Melbourne, Australia
- Area served: Worldwide
- Key people: James Broberg (CEO); John Ellershaw (COO)
- Products: content delivery, video transcoding, video streaming, web accelerator
- Services: Content delivery network, live streaming, website acceleration, video on demand
- Owner: University of Melbourne; Starfish Ventures; James Broberg, John Ellershaw
- Website: MetaCDN.com

MetaCDN is a cloud-based content delivery network company that also offers video transcoding, streaming video and web accelerator services.

Founded in 2011 from research out of the University of Melbourne, MetaCDN is backed by Australian venture capital firm Starfish Ventures and the University of Melbourne's commercialization arm.

MetaCDN leverages services such as Amazon Web Services, Edgecast, and Windows Azure to offer users access to an integrated global network for content delivery. As of July 2012, the company reported having 102 access points in 5 continents on their website.

== StreamShark.io ==
In September 2015 MetaCDN rebranded its live streaming platform to StreamShark. The launch of StreamShark included a complete rebuild of the live streaming & video on demand platform.
