= Gcore =

Public cloud and edge provider

- Type: Privately held company
- Industry: Internet; Cloud computing
- Founded: February 27, 2014; 12 years ago
- Founder: Andre Reitenbach
- Headquarters: Contern, Luxembourg
- Services: Edge computing; Cloud computing
- Number of employees: 500+ (2023)
- ASN: 199524
- Website: gcore.com

Gcore is an edge AI, cloud, network, and security company headquartered in Luxembourg. Founded in 2014, the company provides low-latency services to industries including finance, healthcare, manufacturing, gaming, media and telecommunications internationally. Its global network includes over 210 Points of Presence (PoPs) across six continents.

== History ==
Gcore was founded in 2014 in Luxembourg. The company built its own content delivery network, originally designed for the needs of the gaming industry.

In 2016, Gcore's infrastructure expanded to multiple regions that were underserved by hyperscale cloud providers.

In 2020, the company formed partnerships with Intel and Equinix.

In 2022, Gcore launched the European AI Cloud, providing access to infrastructure for machine learning tasks.

In March 2024, Gcore announced the acquisition of a web application and API protection (WAAP) solution from StackPath.

In April 2024, Gcore received a commendation in the Industry Innovation category at the NVIDIA Partner Network Awards EMEA for developing the first speech-to-text technology for Luxembourgish, using the LuxemBERT AI model.

In May 2024, Philipp Rösler, former vice-chancellor of Germany and federal minister of health joined the Gcore board.

In July 2024, Gcore raised $60 million in a Series A funding round, marking the company's first external investment since its founding.

In August 2024, Gcore was recognized as a Major Player in the IDC MarketScape report for European public cloud Infrastructure (IaaS) 2024 by IDC, the global market intelligence firm.

In May 2025, Feiyu Xu became a member of the Gcore advisory board.

In 2026, NVIDIA listed Gcore among the cloud partners for its Dynamo inference platform.

== Network infrastructure ==
According to the company's website, Gcore has network locations in six continents: Europe, North America, Asia, South America, Africa, and Australia with over 14,000 peering partners and a network capacity exceeding 200 Tbps. According to a 2025 review by Geekflare, Gcore's CDN achieved an average global response time of around 30 milliseconds. Gcore offers AI cloud clusters, including a generative AI cluster with Nvidia GPUs in Luxembourg and additional sites in the Netherlands and Wales, as part of its European AI infrastructure.

== Products and services ==
Gcore offers a range of services, including content delivery network (CDN), cloud computing,virtual machines, bare-metal servers, object storage AI infrastructure and inference, Kubernetes, video streaming, DDoS mitigation, web application and API protection (WAAP), Domain Name System (DNS).

Gcore provides AI services and GPU cloud infrastructure to support model development, training, fine-tuning, and inference. In January 2025, the company introduced Everywhere Inference, a serverless inference solution that enables AI model deployment.

== Controversies ==
Correctiv and Tageszeitung reported that Gcore supported the distribution of the TV network RT until April 2023, which has been under sanctions by the EU since March 2022. However, Gcore denies these allegations.

== Collaborations ==
In 2024, Gcore and Qareeb Data Centres, a data center provider in the Middle East, launched a collaboration to integrate Gcore's AI, cloud and edge services across data centers in multiple Middle Eastern countries.

In June 2025, Gcore joined the SmartSpires initiative, a €3.1 million smart city project co-funded by the Connecting Europe Facility. The three-year programme is coordinated by a public–private consortium including 5SKYE, the Luxembourg Institute of Science and Technology (LIST), Orange Luxembourg, and Gcore. The project aims to transform the Belval campus into a smart city by deploying 5G-enabled smart towers that integrate edge computing, artificial intelligence and IoT services. Within the consortium, Gcore acts as project coordinator and is responsible for the deployment of the edge infrastructure.
