= JSDelivr =

Content delivery network

jsDelivr
- Developer: Dmitriy Akulov
- Release: 2012
- Operating system: Cross-platform
- Type: Free CDN, Public CDN
- Website: www.jsdelivr.com
- Repository: github.com/jsdelivr

JSDelivr (stylized as jsDelivr) is a public content delivery network (CDN) for open-source software projects, including packages hosted on GitHub, npm, and WordPress.org. JSDelivr was created by developer Dmitriy Akulov.

As of September 2022, jsDelivr is estimated to be the third most popular CDN for JavaScript code, behind cdnjs and Google Hosted Libraries. On October 14, 2020, it became the official CDN of Bootstrap. On March 21, 2023, it was announced that jsDelivr joined the CDN Alliance non-profit organization. In May 2023 jsDelivr launched Globalping, a new open source project offering network monitoring APIs and tools.

== Features ==
jsDelivr is primarily used to load code and other resources from repositories on GitHub, npm, and the theme and plugin directories for WordPress. Software developers can request a specific version of a software package, or load the latest available version. jsDelivr can also minify any file in JavaScript, CSS, or SVG format, which can reduce loading times. jsDelivr permanently caches requested files, so they remain accessible even if the original software repository is moved or deleted.

== Operation ==
jsDelivr is powered by other contenttdelivery network providers, including Cloudflare, Fastly and BunnyCDN, and switches to another provider if one is experiencing downtime. In China, Quantil is used as the content delivery network, as other providers are affected by the Great Firewall. jsDelivr is primarily sponsored by Cloudflare, Fastly, NS1, DigitalOcean, and other companies.

Dmitriy Akulov is the only person or entity with full access to all services and servers required to operate jsDelivr.
