= MaximaTelecom =

Russian technology company

- Company type: Private
- Industry: Computer hardware Computer software
- Founded: 2004; 22 years ago
- Headquarters: Moscow, Russia
- Area served: Russia
- Key people: Sergey Aslanyan (Chairman of the Board); Boris Volpe (CEO)
- Products: Networking equipment
- Services: Network Management
- Revenue: not disclosed
- Owner: not disclosed
- Website: http://maximatelecom.ru/en/

MaximaTelecom is a Russian technology company engaged in the development and commercialization of public wireless networks, Wi-Fi network operator in the Moscow Metro.

== History ==
The company was founded in 2004 and for long time was an asset of the Russian systems integrator NVision Group. In 2013, MaximaTelecom was purchased by a group of private investors headed by Sergey Aslanyan, the former president of the group Sitronics. In July of the same year the company took part in the auction of the Moscow Metro for the right to create Wi-Fi network and signed a contract as the only bidder.

== Projects ==
=== Moscow Metro ===
The main contenders for the creation and maintenance of the network in the Moscow metro were cellular operators, members of the 'big three' - MegaFon, Mobile TeleSystems and VimpelCom. Access to the subway infrastructure was interesting for the companies in terms of expanding the coverage area of their own mobile networks and Internet connections. However, operators did not like rates for cabling and placement of base stations, which were significantly increased in 2011. In 2012, two mobile operators launched pilot projects to create Wi-Fi networks that haven’t been developed: MTS created coverage area in the trains of the Circle Line, Vimpelcom — in two trains of Sokolnicheskaya Line.

In December 2012 the Metro held an auction for the right to create a network for the first time. Project Technical requirement presupposed launching of a network for passengers as well as a separate network for internal use; executor of the project received a discount for renting the Moscow subway infrastructure. Companies considered these conditions unattractive and refused to participate in the auction. In the second auction, held in June 2013, the organizer refused to create an internal network and increased preferences for an executor, but the mobile operators were not satisfied with the discount rates. The auction received no bids and it was declared invalid.

Third auction, in July, received the only request from MaximaTelecom. Metro signed a 15-years contract with the only participant at the starting price. According to the contract, the company committed to provide all the rolling stock of Moscow subway with Wi-Fi connection - more than 4,800 cars at that time; the pay-back period was estimated as 7 years at a cost for the project of 1.5 billion rubles.

On 1 September 2013 the first network was launched in trains of Kakhovskaya line, on 25 December – in trains of Circle Line. The link-up of Kalininskaya and Sokolnicheskaya line was completed in February and March 2014 respectively. The company planned a simultaneous commissioning of the network on the Lyublinsko-Dmitrovskaya, Zamoskvoretskaya, Kaluzhsko-Rizhskaya and Tagansko-Krasnopresnenskaya metro lines in October 2014, but on Lyublinsko-Dmitrovskaya and Zamoskvoretskaya lines network was launched ahead of schedule in July. By 1 December 2014 free Wi-Fi was available on all lines of the Moscow Metro. Moreover, the pilot mode network was launched on station platforms Vystavochnaya, Delovoy Tsentr, Ulitsa Starokachalovskaya and Bulvar Dmitriya Donskogo.

More than 900 base stations were installed at 450–900 meters interval to provide coverage over the entire length of the lines. Their signal within the 5 GHz limit is transmitted to fin antennas on the last cars of all 650 trains. From the routers under the antenna the signal is transmitted along the train to all access points in the cars. The network is automatically reconfiguring in case of restructuring the train, adding or detaching cars. Base stations were installed at night, workers laid approximately 2-3 kilometers of cable per shift; the total length of fiber-optic communication lines is more than 880 kilometers. This solution provides access to 70-100 Mbit/s connection (potentially this speed may be increased to 150 Mbit/s using a special software). Capacity of the whole network estimates 20 Gbit/s.

In late 2014 – early 2015 the company brought the project in compliance with the requirements of the identification of users, introduced to the Federal Law № 149-FZ On Information, Information Technologies and Protection of Information by a Government Order number 758 of 31 July 2014, that obliged users to log in with a mobile phone number. In July 2015, an alternative method of identification — with the Common Government Services Portal account — was introduced. During the year, this option was used by 600 thousand users.

In December 2014 MaximaTelecom offered to the operators of 'the big three' to join the project on the organization of cellular network coverage based on Wi-Fi infrastructure Moscow metro network. The proposition was based on the use of portable base stations (femtocells). Tender documentation was submitted for examination to the city authorities. In May 2016 MaximaTelecom signed a strategic cooperation agreement with MTS, which implies the implementation of a project to provide subway passengers with mobile connection of the operator.

=== Petersburg Metro ===
MaximaTelecom is negotiating the development of Wi-Fi networks in trains and stations of the Saint Petersburg Metro with the Government of St. Petersburg. 1 billion rubles is the estimated cost of the project and 1 year is the time of project’s performance. Despite the mutual interest in cooperation, the parties have not reached a compromise on the issue of renting the metro infrastructure: the operator insisted on a nominal fee, but Metro requested about 170 million rubles per year.

As a result, the company refused to participate in the contest, held by the Petersburg metro in November 2015. The contest was declared invalid due to the absence of the applications. Subsequently, the company reported that it is ready to consider participation in the new tender if the conditions are changed.

=== Other projects ===
In November 2015 MaximaTelecom launched the Wi-Fi zone under a new brand AURA at the terminals C, D, E, F, registration, departure, arrival and transit areas of Sheremetyevo International Airport in Moscow. Airport Network is the first not-metro project of the company and it remained free until the modernization of equipment in January 2016. Since July 2016 the network has again become free. In December 2015 AURA wireless network was launched in the Aeroexpress terminal at Paveletsky railway station, in April 2016 — in the terminal at Sheremetyevo airport. The contract between MaximaTelecom and Aeroexpress implies launching the WiFi connection in the remaining terminals in Domodedovo and Vnukovo airports, and at Belorussky and Kievsky railway stations. In September 2016 the company will start the monetization of Wi-Fi network in Aeroexpress train.

In January 2016 the company announced the future launch of AURA networks and interactive information and entertainment portal in the children's educational park Kidzania. The company is also engaged in the creation of Wi-Fi network at the internet forums RIF + KIB 2015, RIF + KIB 2016 and Russian Internet Week 2015.

In February 2016 MaximaTelecom won the tender for equipping the trains of Central Suburban Passenger Company with Wi-Fi connection: during 2016 the company will equip 65 suburban trains.

In December 2015 ‘MaximaTelecom’ announced its plans to enter the United States market, negotiations with the mayor's offices of several major cities, the executives of the local subway and the Amtrak. Presumably, the first city where MaximaTelecom will begin to work in 2016, is the New York City.

In December 2021, "MaximaTelecom" and Gazprom-Media launched joint venture "GPM-Data" for development of products, based on artificial intellect and machine-learning.

== Business model ==
In the Moscow subway company makes profit of advertising banners on the portal wi-fi.ru (before June 2015 it was vmet.ro), which is loaded when you connect to the network and between the sites visited by the user. Full-screen advertising modules are displayed in mobile applications which use the built-in operating system to display Web content. Paid fees that disable advertisements were introduced in May 2015. In September, the company introduced a 'seamless authentication' for paid users: a device connects to the network automatically, without having to open the browser. Since February 2016 access to the network is restricted for devices that use ad-blocking software like browser extensions or applications.

In October 2015 MaximaTelecom together with the company Data-Centric Alliance launched a platform AURA Place, oriented at small and medium businesses, where you can purchase the advertisement in the Wi-Fi subway network. The system is targeting banner ads on subway lines and stations, time, presumed place of work and residence of passengers, it also has a built-in constructor for creating banners and simple websites.

By the IV quarter of 2015 the daily audience of Wi-Fi network was 1.2 million. More than 50 thousand users have paid subscriptions. According to the company, 75% of revenue came from mobile advertising. In 2015, there were more than 550 million connections to free Wi-Fi in Moscow metro. Every day, the company delivers 70 TB of traffic. According to the TMT Consulting, in 2015 MaximaTelecom received 52% of the revenue of the Moscow market of public Wi-Fi.

Portal wi-fi.ru has news and thematic sections, such as goods from Yandex.Market and video from Rutube. As part of the collaboration which began in the summer of 2015, Gazprom-Media and MaximaTelecom share the revenue from video advertising sold by Agency Gazprom-Media Digital. IMHO VI, Russia's largest seller of online advertising, also places their ads. The company cooperates with stream service Zvooq, local news service Meanwhile, Yandex, Moscow Credit Bank. In December 2015 the company received an order from Federal Antimonopoly Service for sending SMS messages advertising Yandex.Taxi: the user agreement didn’t have an option of refusing to receive advertising materials.

The Company also makes profit of telecommunication services and offers shopping centers visitor analytics.

=== Financial data ===
By autumn of 2015, more than 2 billion rubles were invested into the project. Operating pay-back is scheduled for 2016, the return of investment in the project — up to 2020.

== Owners and executive management ==
MaximaTelecom shareholders list is not disclosed. It is known that it includes Sergey Aslanyan, Chairman of the Board. CEO is Boris Volpe.

== Awards ==
In 2014, the Wi-Fi network project in the Moscow metro won CNews Awards in the category ‘Technology in the public sector’ and The Moscow Times Awards in the category Best City Improvement. In 2015, the company became the 'discovery of the year' at Runet Prize.

In October 2015 an international association of Wireless Broadband Alliance awarded the Wi-Fi network project in the Moscow metro as the world's best public Wi-Fi network. MaximaTelecom became the first Russian company to receive the award of this association.
