= Internap =

American information technology company

Internap Holding LLC (INAP)
- Type: Private
- Traded as: Nasdaq: INAP
- Industry: IT infrastructure services
- Founded: 1996; 30 years ago
- Headquarters: Norcross, Georgia, United States
- Key people: John Scanlon, President and Chief Executive Officer
- Products: Hosting, Data center, Cloud computing
- Revenue: $317 million (2018)
- Number of employees: 100 (approximate)
- ASN: 29791
- Website: inap.com

Internap Holding LLC, formerly Internap Corporation and operating as INAP, is a company that sells data center and cloud computing services. The company is headquartered in Norcross, Georgia, United States, and has data centers located in North America, EMEA and the Asia-Pacific region. INAP sells its Performance IP, hosting, cloud, colocation and hybrid infrastructure services through Private Network Access Points (P-NAP) in North America, Europe, Asia-Pacific and Australia.

== History ==
Founded in Seattle, Washington in 1996, the company's initial public offering (IPO) took place in 1999. In 2000, INAP's patented Managed Internet Route Optimizer (MIRO) technology was added to the Smithsonian's permanent technology exhibit.

Peter Aquino was named president and CEO of INAP in September 2016. Previously, he was chairman and CEO, and later executive chairman, of Primus Telecommunications Group, Inc.

In 2011, INAP launched the world's first commercially available OpenStack Cloud Compute service. In June 2011, the INAP Santa Clara data center became the first commercial data center in the U.S. to achieve the Green Building Initiative's Green Globe certification.

Mike Ruffolo was president and CEO from May 2015 until September 2016. He was a member of the company's board of directors. Previously, he was president and CEO of Crossbeam Systems, Inc. The company named Daniel C. Stanzione, non-executive chairman of the board in June 2009; he has been a director since 2004.

On February 28, 2018, Internap acquired SingleHop for $132 million in cash.

On March 16, 2020, Internap Technology Solutions, Inc. and six affiliated companies filed Chapter 11 bankruptcy in the United States District Court for the Southern District of New York. The company emerged from bankruptcy on May 11, 2020.

Less than a month after emerging from bankruptcy, on June 2, INAP announced that it sold its colocation business located at 1301 Fannin St, Houston TX, to Netrality.

On July 1, 2021, INAP sold Ubersmith to Lumine Group for an undisclosed amount. The following month, on August 2, Leaseweb acquired INAP's Canadian data centres, then operating under the iWeb name.

In 2022, INAP continued to sell its assets. On May 9, INAP announced that it sold the assets associated with its network business, including INAP Japan, to Unitas Global. And on September 14, it announced the sale of the majority of the assets associated with the colocation business, consisting of nine sites, to Evocative.

On September 28, 2022, INAPs product "ServerIntellect" was the target of a ransomware attack that affected its multitenant website, database, and email hosting services causing data loss for those services. As a result, INAP discontinued multitenant hosting services. INAP removed the original ransomware incident report from its "Operational Transparency" page on October 5, 2022. Techradar published an article speculating that INAP's removal of the original incident report was an attempt to conceal the full effects of the ransomware attack.

On April 27, 2023, it was announced that INAP would be preparing another Chapter 11 filing and give lenders control of the company. On April 28, 2023, INAP filed for Chapter 11 bankruptcy again. A process they completed on August 1, 2023.

On January 24, 2024, INAP rebranded to HorizonIQ.

== Acquisitions and growth ==
In 2000, INAP acquired CO Space, giving the company its first entry into the datacenter services business, which represents the majority of the company's current revenues. In the same year, INAP also acquired VPNX.com, a managed VPN provider. INAP acquired VitalStream Holdings, a content delivery service provider, in February 2007. In early 2012, INAP announced that it had acquired Voxel Holdings, Inc., a provider of scalable hosting and cloud services for enterprise users. In November 2013, INAP announced the acquisition of iWeb, a hosting and cloud provider based in Montreal, Canada.

In December of 2025, Summit announced they had acquired HorizonIQ. In the statement it said "All HorizonIQ services will continue uninterrupted during integration. Over the coming months, HorizonIQ’s technology and teams will become part of the Summit brand and platform."
