= StreamZilla =

Content delivery network

StreamZilla is a European video platform for professionals. The platform is Digital Sovereign, green hosted, EAA WCAG compliant, and GDPR compliant. The company is located in the city Groningen, Netherlands.

== Overview ==
StreamZilla offers streaming video hosting to customers like governments, education, health care, marketeers, video portals, broadcasters, football clubs, publishers, enterprises and video production companies. The service lets you upload, manage and publish videos. Features include high quality adaptive bit rate transcoding, packaging and streaming via global CDN, auto subtitle and transcript generation, auto translation, auto thumbnail and poster image generation, branding customization, publishing controls with public, private and password protected videos.

== Compliance ==
StreamZilla was built around compliance with European laws, among:

- Digital Sovereignty: SEAL levels 3 and 4. The European owned service is self hosted in Europe, with own software, and zero use of non-EU services or software.
- GDPR: compliance with Europe's data protection laws by data minimization, pseudonimization, zero data sharing with third parties, and serverside analytics.
- EAA: the video player conforms to European accessibility laws, by offering features such as hearing aid, visual aid, contrast controls and keyboard navigation.
- Green: the service is ISO 14001 certified hosted with green energy and is built with low power high efficiency hardware.

== History ==
- StreamZilla was founded in 2003 and became market leader in the BeNeLux and grew 1800% in the first five years.
- StreamZilla won the Streaming Media Magazine Readers' Choice award for best European Content Delivery Network 2008.
- In 2026 StreamZilla was relaunched as a digital sovereign video platform.

== Technologies ==
StreamZilla is powered by Jet-Stream technologies for encoding, packaging, translation, CDN, analytics and player.
