= CenterServ International, Ltd =

Canadian technology company

CenterServ International, Ltd.
- Type: Private
- Industry: Server and cloud computing
- Headquarters: Montreal, Quebec, Canada
- Areas served: 200 cities
- Services: Cloud Computing, data centers and servers
- Website: www.centerserv.com

CenterServ is an international provider of cloud and dedicated server hosting. According to its website, CenterServ owns the server hardware used for these services, supplies hosting directly to customers, and is not a hosting reseller.

History

In early 2000, in the middle of the dot-com bubble, InexMédia started as a small communication agency called InexMédia out of Montreal, Canada. The company began offering a wide range of Web related services. In 2004, InexMédia change its name to Group e-media.com and started offering managed servers and web hosting under the brand name E serves. When the company began to develop its international managed services and E serves become its primary business, the company was re-formed as CenterServ. In 2009, as the company grew and gained international presence, CenterServ started offering free cloud computing certification to IT professionals and systems administrators. Those certifications were used for internal purposes and for private corporation objectives.

During the certification process, CenterServ signs a data center access agreement with each member, granting CenterServ access to each member's data center. In exchange, CenterServ would give each member an exclusivity service contract for any hosted solution. Additionally, CenterServ would grant them access to virtual offices and other international office space companies. It is with these agreements that CenterServ decentralized the data center and cloud computing industry.

By February 2016, CenterServ had a pool of more than 1500 certified members and IT professionals in all fields.

== Business Model ==
CenterServ has two primary lines of business; Cloud Servers and Dedicated Servers offered on a global scale. CenterServ helps design, build, and implement personalized services and offer cloud computing consulting services as part of their service agreements.

== Social activity ==
Although the founders began as MIS administrator and Finance specialists, they found that most companies were often put off by the cloud industry's lack of services personalization, and by a lack of data center services accessibility in most parts of the globe.

The CenterServ Private Institute is also responsible of selecting franchises. Selected candidates are retained mostly based on past experience, education, relations and/or ideas and innovation.
