= CacheFly =

Content delivery network

- Company type: LLC
- Website type: internet
- Available in: English
- Founded: 1999; 27 years ago (as Downloadhosting.com)
- Headquarters: Chicago, IL, USA
- Area served: Worldwide
- Founder: Matt Levine
- Key people: Drazen Dodig, Martin Lagler, Megan Killion
- Industry: Content delivery network
- Products: Content delivery network, Ultra-low-latency streaming, Image optimization, Edge scripting, Transcoding, DVR, Web optimization, VOD delivery, Game delivery
- Website: CacheFly.com
- Launched: 2005

CacheFly is a content delivery network (CDN) provider based in Chicago, Illinois with a 100% remote team. In 1999 CacheFly started as Downloadhosting.com for file distribution for small software developers, by CTO, Matt Levine.

The CacheFly service was launched in March 2005.

In 2016 despite limited marketing or sales efforts CacheFly crossed 15,000 hostnames, growing primarily through word of mouth from existing customers. That same year CacheFly launched advanced media services with progressive downloads, adaptive streaming, transcoding, and transmuxing as added capabilities.

With analytics becoming a major growth market CacheFly launched a new advanced analytics dashboard in 2018, with a major face-lift again in 2021.

2020 saw major growth for digital companies, including CacheFly. The company began focusing on peering routes to work towards a healthier internet in the face of the global digital migration.

== Major companies and organizations known to be using CacheFly ==
- Ars Technica
- Various podcasts on the TWiT network
- OverDrive
- Roblox
- PluralSight
- GameStop
- SkillSoft

== See also ==
- Anycast
