= Amazon CloudFront =

Content delivery network

- Website type: Content Delivery Network (CDN)
- Owner: Amazon
- Website: aws.amazon.com/cloudfront
- IPv6 support: Yes
- Registration: Required
- Launched: November 18, 2008; 17 years ago

Amazon CloudFront is a content delivery network (CDN) operated by Amazon Web Services. The content delivery network was created in November 2008 to provide a globally-distributed network of proxy servers to cache content, such as web videos or other bulky media, more locally to consumers, to improve access speed for downloading the content.

CloudFront has servers located in the United Kingdom, Ireland, the Netherlands, Germany, Spain, Hong Kong, Singapore, Japan, Taiwan, Vietnam, Indonesia, India, Australia, South America, Africa, and several major cities in the United States. In May 2025, the service operated from 1600+ edge locations on every continent excluding Antarctica.

CloudFront operates on a pay-as-you-go basis.

CloudFront competes with larger CDNs, such as Akamai, Azion, and Cloudflare. Upon launch, Larry Dignan of ZDNet News stated that CloudFront could cause price and margin reductions for competing CDNs.

== Timeline ==
- November 18, 2008 – Beta launch of CloudFront
- May 7, 2009 – Adds access logging capability
- November 11, 2009 – Adds support for private content
- December 15, 2009 – Announced Amazon CloudFront Streaming
- March 28, 2010 – Amazon launches edge locations in Singapore and adds private content for streaming
- May 2014 – CloudFront is included in AWS's Free Tier
