= SingleHop =

American IT hosting company

SingleHop, LLC
- Type: Private
- Industry: Cloud Computing Provider
- Founded: 2006; 20 years ago
- Founder: Zak Boca; Dan Ushman
- Headquarters: 215 W. Ohio St., 5th Floor; Chicago, Illinois 60654, United States
- Key people: Andy Pace; Mark Cravotta; Jordan Jacobs
- Products: Bare metal servers, public clouds, private clouds, hybrid clouds, IT managed services
- Number of employees: 175
- Website: www.singlehop.com

SingleHop, LLC is an American IT hosting company and services provider based out of Chicago, Illinois, USA. The company has data centers in Chicago, Arizona, and the Netherlands. SingleHop provides bare metal dedicated servers, public and private clouds, as well as managed services to more than 4,000 clients in 114 countries.

Inc. Magazine named SingleHop the 25th fastest-growing U.S. company in 2011. In 2012, the company raised $27.5 million in venture funding from Battery Ventures.

== History ==
In 2003, Zak Boca and Dan Ushman founded the shared hosting platform midPhase. As midPhase became more successful, both Boca and Ushman noticed their customers wanted to grow past the limitations found with shared web hosting. To avoid the limitations found in shared hosting, many customers began to make the move to dedicated server hosting. Unfortunately for Boca and Ushman, midPhase did not provide dedicated hosting, nor could the brand expand to include dedicated server hosting. Therefore, in 2006, SingleHop was started as means to give midPhase's current customers a chance to expand into dedicated servers without moving to a completely new service provider. A year later, midPhase was sold to UK2 Group, and both Boca and Ushman focused on building up SingleHop.

By 2008, the company generated $2.8 million in revenue. In 2011, SingleHop's revenue jumped to $22 million.

In 2012, the company raised $27.5 million from Boston-based Battery Ventures.

On February 28, 2018, SingleHop was acquired by Internap for $132 million in cash.

== Product ==
SingleHop operates an infrastructure-as-a-service and managed hosting services business model. The company provides a variety of IaaS services, and managed services, both backed by high levels of automation.

LEAP, the company's management platform, allows clients to manage IT infrastructure such as bare metal servers and cloud products from a single platform.

== Awards and recognition ==
Inc. Magazine named SingleHop as one of the fastest growing U.S.-based companies in 2010, 2011 and 2012.

In 2012, the company was ranked #25 on Inc's list of IT Services Companies and the 25th fastest-growing company in the Chicago Metro Area.
