= Edgecast =

American content delivery network provider

Edgecast, Inc.
- Formerly: Verizon Digital Media Services (2014–2021), Edgio (2022-2024)
- Type: Subsidiary
- Industry: Internet
- Founded: August 2006; 20 years ago
- Fate: Acquired by Parler Cloud Technologies
- Successor: Edgecast
- Headquarters: Dallas, Texas
- Key people: Alex Kazerani (CEO & Founder); James Segil (President & Founder); Phil Goldsmith (CRO & Founder); Jay Sakata (CTO & Founder); Lior Elazary (Chief Research Officer & Founder)
- Number of employees: 400+ (2021)
- Parent: Parler Cloud Technologies (2025–on)
- ASN: 15133
- Website: edgecast.io

Edgecast, Inc. (formerly Edgio, formerly Verizon Digital Media Services, formerly Edgecast Networks, Inc) was a subsidiary of Yahoo! Inc. and provider of content delivery network (CDN) and video streaming services. Founded in 2006, it was notable for being a self-provisioning CDN technology used by the telecommunication and hosting industries.

On June 16, 2022, Edgecast was acquired by Limelight Networks and was rebranded as Edgio.

In late 2024, Edgio entered Chapter 11 bankruptcy. On February 10, 2025, Edgecast and its technology was sold to Parler Cloud Technologies. The majority of the Edgio assets were purchased by Akamai.

== History ==
Edgecast Networks, Inc. was founded in 2006 and received funding from the venture arm of The Walt Disney Company, Steamboat Ventures. It was headquartered in Los Angeles, California.

On December 9, 2013, the boards of directors of Verizon Communications and Edgecast each approved Verizon's acquisition of Edgecast and the deal was closed on December 23, 2013.

Between 2013 and 2016, Edgecast Networks was a subsidiary of Verizon as part of the Verizon Digital Media Services group, among upLynk LLC and others.

In 2017, Verizon Digital Media Services, Inc. (VDMS) became part of Oath Inc., which was rebranded Verizon Media on January 8, 2019. In September 2021, VDMS was rebranded as Edgecast following the Apollo Global Management purchase of 90% stake of Verizon Media, which in turn became the current incarnation of Yahoo! Inc.

On March 7, 2022, Limelight Networks announced its intention to acquire Edgecast for approximately $300 million. Once the deal is approved, the companies will jointly rebrand as Edgio. The acquisition was completed on June 16, 2022 and the company was rebranded as Edgio.

In the fall of 2024, Edgio entered bankruptcy proceedings. The winning bid by Akamai took select assets that did not include Edgecast's technology. The technology that Edgecast had developed was sold to Parler Cloud Technologies on February 10, 2025 and the Edgecast brand reborn in early 2025.

The company was rated the third in the CDN industry by the Yankee Group in August 2009, and turned EBITA positive in Q2 of 2009. Edgecast was ranked 13th on the Deloitte Fast 500 list for North America 2012.

== Uplynk ==
Uplynk, stylized as upLynk, was a Los Angeles–based startup company founded in 2010 that created video-streaming services, notably used by Disney–ABC Television Group. As of January 2013, it had 10 employees and was self-funded; at that time, Disney Interactive Media Group's technology SVP Skarpi Hedinsson remarked, "The upLynk platform offers significant operational efficiency and simplifies the process of reaching audiences on any device or platform while maintaining a high quality viewing experience." It was acquired by Verizon Digital Media Services on November 13, 2013, reportedly for greater than $75 million.

== Logos ==
The company used the following logo during its early years:
