= Aparat =

Iranian video sharing service

- Native name: آپارات
- Website type: Video hosting services
- Available in: Persian, English
- Founded: April 13, 2011; 15 years ago
- Headquarters: Tehran, Iran
- Area served: Worldwide (except Indonesia and North Korea)
- Founder: Saba Idea Tech Company
- President: Mohammad Javad Shakouri Moghaddam
- Key people: Mohammad Mahdi Shakouri Moghaddam, Mohammad Fazlollahi, Ali Tehraninasr
- Services: Video sharing service, social media
- Parent: Saba idea
- Website: www.aparat.com
- Registration: Yes - Optional (required for posting videos and comments)
- Current status: Active

Aparat (Persian: آپارات, romanized: Âpârât) is an Iranian video-sharing and social media platform established in 2011 by Saba Idea. Headquartered in Tehran, Iran, it has become the most visited video-sharing service in Iran, offering a diverse range of content across various genres, including entertainment, education, and news. Its user base exceeds 60 million monthly users. The platform also recorded 21 million daily pageviews, totaling approximately 7.6 billion annually. Aparat was selected as the best film website in 2011.

== History ==
Aparat was introduced to Iranian users in February 2010, when many international video sharing services were restricted in Iran. Shakouri, Aparat service manager, has stated the reason for provision of this service for Iranian users as "high volume of users’ requests for a video sharing service."

After one year of operation, an Android version of the service was launched in February 2011. In December 2012 the website exceeded one million video views. In July 2013, the iOS version of Aparat was released. Later that year in November 2013, the first online photo contest called "Tehran’s Guest (Tehran Municipality)" was held in cooperation with Tehran Municipality. Later in March 2014 the second version of the app was released on Android. In April 2014, the President of Islamic Republic of Iran created an account and created the first official government channel.

This was followed by the Minister of Communications soon after. Subsequently, numerous political, cultural and artistic figures and brands gradually launched their official channels on the service. Aparat broadcast the 2014 World Cup Competitions and held an Iranian talent contest in July 2014 named "Iranian Prodigies". As of October 2014, the daily views of Aparat videos exceeded four million views per day. In November 2014, Aparat Kids was launched, and in January 2014 Filimo, which streams both Iranian and international movies and TV series, was launched.

== Video features ==
While most videos are accessible by all users without subscription, some are placed behind paywalls at the choice of the uploader. Users can upload videos in different formats, such as mpeg, 3gp, webm, mkv, avi and mp4. Uploading and watching videos in HD quality is also possible for subscribers. The maximum filesize for videos is 1500 MB, though larger files can be uploaded with "approved accounts”. As of July 21, 2015, Aparat started supporting subtitles. Users can upload subtitles along with their videos. This has allowed expansion into viewership in languages other than Persian. Uploaded videos can be tagged based on various interests. There is no limit for the number of tags on a video.

== Service features ==
In order to upload videos on Aparat, users must first register a member account. Users can then upload videos, post comments on other videos and follow other users. The accounts are divided into two groups: verified and unverified. Members can also view statistics, like videos, and receive notifications. More detailed analytics are also available for uploaders. Videos which are viewed and rated highest are displayed on users home pages. Videos uploaded must be categorized under the following categories: Games, Educational, Comedic, Personal, Religious, Film, Entertainment, Political, News, Music, Sports, Events, Science and Technology, Cartoons, Animals, Nature, Artistic, Advertisement, or other user defined categories. Aparat supports video embedding; to counteract the low quality and speed of Iranian Internet, users can also download videos at higher quality instead of streaming.

Channels of officials and verified people have a green check mark next to their avatar. A number of prominent figures and officials in the Islamic Republic of Iran have official channels and are active in this service. Aparat is one of the few Iranian social media platforms with authentication. Membership rose after several controversies involving Islamic Republic officials using non-Iranian social networks such as Facebook. There are also numerous cultural and artistic figures and famous brands that have official channels on the service. Currently there are 201 approved official channels.

While most channels are unpaid by default, uploaders can go into the paid programs to make money from their videos.

== Competitions ==
In 2014, Aparat started an online contest called "Iranian Prodigies" in order to find talented Iranians in different fields. This competition was held from September 11 to October 19 and judged by various well-known figures. The competition was held in 5 general parts. Shakouri, Aparat's manager, reported that the website received 3,279 entries that were viewed more than 2 million times. Aparat intends to hold the subsequent rounds of the competition by drawing on the experiences from the first round. Following his talk about "Iranian Prodigies", Shakouri asserted: "The videos were uploaded from different regions of the country, even the areas that have few facilities, as in villages." The second round of competition is slated to take place on August 12, 2015.

== Subsidiaries ==
In December 2014, a new feature called "Aparat Kids" was added. This feature intended to make it easier for children to browse through the available online content while ensuring parents that their children had access to appropriate content. Aparat developed an application for Android and Windows Phone users.

== Social impact ==
As part of internet censorship in Iran, Iranian usage of YouTube and other international video sharing services was gradually diminished. The main challenge for Aparat's introduction was to ensure Iranian users had the same capabilities and features present in outside services. With this goal in mind, an Android app was launched in December. On January 12, 2013, IRIB released a documentary on the service, broadcast in Café So’al (Question Café) Program of National TV. Aparat ranks third on Alexa among Iranian websites and 47th globally. The website is also widely used in neighboring countries, such as Afghanistan, Azerbaijan, and Tajikistan. 12% of traffic comes from outside of Iran. Aparat's smart phone app is available on Android, iOS and Windows Phone. In April 2015, UN created its official channel with an announced goal of "providing more information on its activities in Iran and the world". They have so far uploaded about 60 videos. Gary Lewis, UN Resident Coordinator in the Islamic Republic of Iran, expressed delight at the UN's joining.

== Aparat's current status ==
Aparat's total bandwidth is 40 Gbit/s with over four thousand daily uploads. The monthly traffic of this service is 15 million hours watched per month with over 25 million unique visitors, 30% of which are mobile and 12% of which come from outside the country.

== Advertisements in Aparat ==
Aparat's main revenue stream comes from advertisements. Saba Vision Advertising Agency manages advertisements.

== See also ==
- Filimo
- Rubika
