= Predictions of violence ahead of the January 6 United States Capitol attack =

2020-21 political commentary

Ahead of the January 6 United States Capitol attack, there were widespread predictions of violence. Trump supporters, their opponents, media figures, and law enforcement all warned of upcoming violence. In 2023, a Senate report would conclude the attack was "planned in plain sight". Researchers predicted the violence was likely to occur if the elections were close and if Trump could not ensure that his supporters would commit fraud on his behalf.

== Public predictions of violence ==
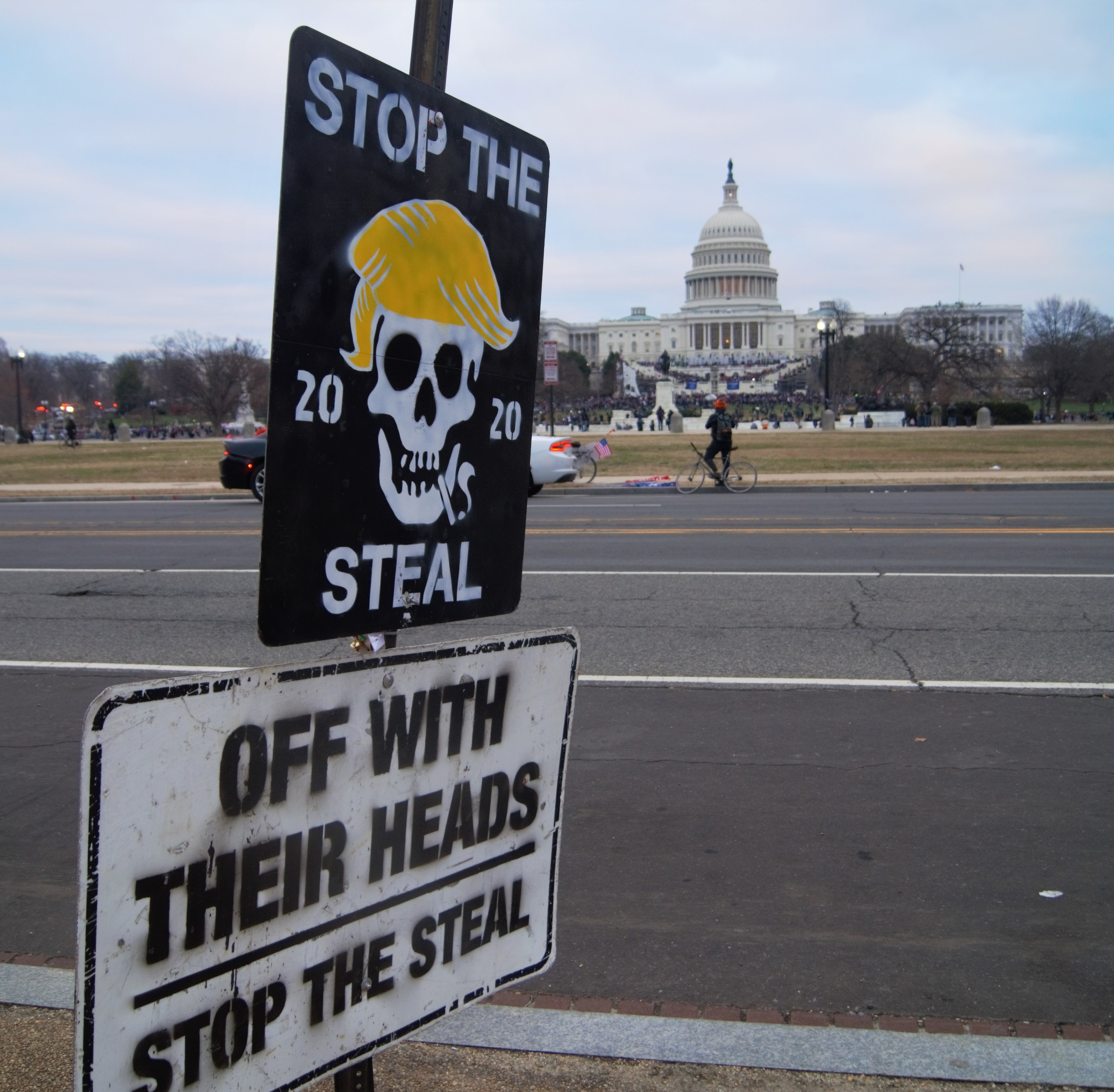
Signs reading Stop the Steal and Off with their heads, photographed on the day of the attack

In 2019, Kara Swisher, a columnist for The New York Times, envisioned what would happen "if Mr. Trump loses the 2020 election and tweets inaccurately the next day that there had been widespread fraud and, moreover, that people should rise up in armed insurrection to keep him in office". In early September 2020, YouTuber and political commentator Tim Pool said in a recorded conversation that "I've had messages from people saying that they've already got plans to rush to D.C. as soon as Nov. 3 goes chaotic", and that, "The right-wing militias, the Oath Keepers, the Three Percenters, and just the Proud Boys and Trump supporters, they are going to rush full-speed to D.C. They are going to take the White House and do whatever they can and paramilitary." On December 1, 2020, a Georgia election official publicly warned, "Stop inspiring people to commit potential acts of violence. Someone's going to get hurt. Someone's going to get shot. Someone's going to get killed."

For several weeks before the event, there were over one million mentions of storming the Capitol on social media, including calls for violence against Congress, Pence, and police. This was done on "alt-tech" platforms (Note: There were also calls for violence on January 6 on mainstream social media platforms (such as Twitter and TikTok), although the majority of posts there were not explicit in this regard.) such as news aggregator website Patriots.win, (Note: Successor to the Reddit forum r/The_Donald) chat app Telegram and Twitter-like microblogging websites Gab and Parler, (Note: There were also calls for violence on other alt-tech websites and apps such as online video platforms Odysee and DLive, imageboard website 8chan, social networking services MeWe, Minds and Wimkin, humor website iFunny, communications app Discord, and others.) as well as on mainstream social media platforms, such as TikTok. Many of the posters planned for violence before the event; some discussed how to avoid police on the streets, which tools to bring to help pry open doors, and how to smuggle weapons into the city. They discussed their perceived need to attack the police. Following clashes with Washington, D.C., police during protests on December 12, 2020, the Proud Boys and other far-right groups turned against supporting law enforcement.

On December 21, 2020, a viral tweet predicted, "On January 6, armed Trumpist militias will be rallying in D.C., at Trump's orders. It's highly likely that they'll try to storm the Capitol after it certifies Joe Biden's win."

On December 28, 2020, a map was posted showing entrances and exits to the Capitol and the tunnels that connect it to nearby House and Senate office buildings. Perimeters were drawn in red, orange, and yellow designed to reflect their relative importance while black X's represented forces that are 'ready for action' if Congress tries to certify the 2020 Presidential election. On January 1, the operator of an obscure website about tunnels under Capitol noticed a huge spike in traffic to the site, prompting him to notify the FBI of a likely upcoming attack on the building.

On December 29, 2020, D.C.'s Hotel Harrington, a past gathering spot for Proud Boys, announced closure from January 4–6, citing public safety. Harry's Pub, another Proud Boys hotspot, similarly announced a temporary closure.

On December 30, 2020, former Pence aide Olivia Troye publicly expressed fears "that violence could erupt in Washington, D.C., on January 6". That same day, one popular comment was posted, saying, "I'm thinking it will be literal war on that day. Where we'll storm offices and physically remove and even kill all the D.C. traitors and reclaim the country." That comment was highlighted in a January 2 article by The Daily Beast which reported protesters were discussing bringing guns to the District, breaking into federal buildings, and attacking law enforcement.

Multiple sites graphically and explicitly discussed "war", physically taking charge at the event, and killing politicians, even soliciting opinions about which politician should be hanged first, with a GIF of a noose. Joan Donovan, research director at Harvard's Shorenstein Center on Media, Politics and Public Policy, said that key figures in the Unite the Right rally and the Gamergate online harassment campaign worked to raise online fury ahead of the attack. Facebook and Twitter have also been cited as playing a role in the fomenting of the Capitol attack.

A January 2 article by The Daily Beast reported protesters were discussing bringing guns to the District, breaking into federal buildings, and attacking law enforcement. The article quoted one popular comment "I'm thinking it will be literal war on that day. Where we'll storm offices and physically remove and even kill all the D.C. traitors and reclaim the country."

On January 5, media published stories about widespread predictions of violence, and D.C. Mayor Bowser called for residents to avoid the downtown area where protesters would march. That day, members of Congress reached out to law enforcement charge with protecting the Capitol against possible upcoming violence and were assured Capitol Police were prepared.

== Official predictions and warnings ==
In the days leading up to the attack, several organizations monitoring online extremism had been issuing warnings about the event. On December 20, 2020, the FBI received a tip warning that the Proud Boys planned to be in DC and were planning "to literally kill people." In an internal report dated December 29, 2020, the Federal Bureau of Investigation's (FBI) Minneapolis field office warned of armed protests at every state capitol, orchestrated by the far-right boogaloo movement, before Biden's inauguration. By January 3, the FBI was aware of social media posts calling for an armed encampment on the mall and for the storming of the Capitol on January 6.

On January 5, the Norfolk field office of the FBI reported plans of violence: "An online thread discussed specific calls for violence to include stating 'Be ready to fight. Congress needs to hear glass breaking, doors being kicked in, and blood from their BLM and Pantifa [sic] slave soldiers being spilled. Get violent. Stop calling this a march, or rally, or a protest. Go there ready for war. We get our President or we die. NOTHING else will achieve this goal.'" The Norfolk report noted that planners shared a map of the tunnels underneath the Capitol. Another comment, cited in the FBI memo, advocated for Trump supporters going to Washington "to get violent to stop this, especially the antifa maggots who are sure to come out en masse even if we get the Prez for 4 more years".

Before January 6, the FBI notified the local Joint Terrorism Task Force of possible impending violence at the Capitol. The Washington Post reported an internal FBI document on January 5 warned of rioters preparing to travel to Washington and setting up staging areas in various regional states. The FBI did not distribute a formal intelligence bulletin. Some security specialists later reported they had been surprised that they had not received information from the FBI and DHS before the event.

Robert Contee, the acting Chief of the Metropolitan Police Department of the District of Columbia, said after the event that his department had possessed no intelligence indicating the Capitol would be breached. Capitol Police chief Steven Sund said his department had developed a plan to respond to "First Amendment activities", but had not planned for the "criminal riotous behavior" they encountered. Three days before the Capitol attack, the Capitol Police intelligence unit had circulated an internal memo warning that Trump supporters "see January 6, 2021, as the last opportunity to overturn the results of the presidential election" and could use violence against "Congress itself" on that date. Sund said he directed the department to be placed on "all hands on deck" status (contrary to early reports), which meant every sworn officer would be working. He also said he activated seven Civil Disturbance Unit platoons, approximately 250 officers, with four of those platoons equipped in helmets, protective clothing, and shields. U.S. Secretary of the Army Ryan D. McCarthy said law enforcement agencies' estimates of the potential size of the crowd, calculated in advance of the event, varied between 2,000 and 80,000. On January 5, the National Park Service estimated that 30,000 people would attend the "Save America" rally, based on people already in the area.

Other organizations, such as the Anti-Defamation League, British security firm G4S, and nonpartisan governance watchdog Advance Democracy, Inc., studied QAnon posts and made various warnings of the potential of violence on January 6.
