= Umidigi A9 =

Android smartphone

Umidigi A9 Umidigi A9 Pro Umidigi A9 Max
- Brand: Umidigi
- Type: Smartphone
- Predecessor: Umidigi A7
- Successor: Umidigi A11
- Compatible networks: LTE-FDD, TDD-LTE, WCDMA, SCDMA, GSM
- Form factor: Slate
- Dimensions: H: 158.7mm W: 74.9mm D: 8.6mm
- Operating system: Original: Android 11
- System-on-chip: MediaTek Helio G25
- CPU: 4x2 GHz Cortex-A53 + 4x1.5 GHz
- GPU: IMG PowerVR GE8320
- Memory: 3 GB LPDDR4X; 6 GB LPDDR4X (Pro); 8 GB LPDDR4X (Max)
- Storage: 64 GB or 128 GB models
- Battery: 4150mAh
- Charging: USB Type-C
- Rear camera: 48MP Sony AI matrix quad camera 48MP HD (32MP HD for 4GB + 64GB variant), Ultra wide-angle mode, Steady handheld night photography, Macro mode, Portrait mode, Panorama mode, HDR, AI Beautify, Ultra wide-angle edge distortion correction, Dual LED flash, Face recognition, Real-time filters
- Front camera: 24MP Sony
- Display: 6.3" FHD+ Full Screen 2340 x 1080 resolution
- Website: https://umidigi.com/page-umidigi_a9pro_specification.html

The Umidigi A9, A9 Pro, and A9 Max are Android-based smartphones sold by Umidigi unveiled in December 2020.

In July 2021, the A9 Pro gained media attention after it was reported that a white-label version of the device with modified software was being sold in the United States as the "Freedom Phone", with marketing targeting conservatives.

== Specifications ==
The A9 is powered by a MediaTek Helio G25 system-on-a-chip (SoC) with a 2.0 GHz CPU and 3 GB of LPDDRX4 RAM. It includes 64 GB of external storage, which is expandable via a microSD card slot contained within its dual SIM tray. The A9 Pro is powered by a MediaTek Helio P60 SoC and includes 128 GB of storage and 6 GB of RAM. The A9 uses a 6.53-inch display, while the A9 Pro uses a 6.3-inch display. The A9 includes 13-megapixel and 8-megapixel ultra-wide rear-facing cameras with a 2-megapixel depth sensor and 8-megapixel front-facing camera, while the A9 Pro uses 48-megapixel quad rear-facing cameras and a 24-megapixel front-facing camera. Both devices also include an integrated infrared thermometer. The devices ship with Android 11.

In February 2021, Umidigi announced a third model in the A9 line known as the A9 Max, which utilizes the MediaTek Helio P60 SoC, has 8 GB of RAM and a curved display.

== Freedom Phone ==
Freedom Phone logo

In March 2021, Erik Finman, a 22-year-old who described himself as the "world's youngest Bitcoin millionaire", announced that he would be producing a smartphone targeting conservatives in the United States. Finman promoted the device as including access to apps "censored" by Apple and Google such as Parler, Newsmax, and One America News Network (OANN).

The smartphone, branded as "Freedom Phone", was officially launched on July 14, 2021 via a social media post by conservative commentator Candace Owens, and was promoted by other conservative activists and commentators such as Ali Alexander, Dinesh D'Souza, Roger Stone and Jack Posobiec. It was marketed in particular to supporters of then-former U.S. President Donald Trump, with advertising promoting the device as a "free speech and privacy first" smartphone, that its hardware was "comparable to the best smartphones", and that it included an "uncensorable" app store known as "PatriApp" that would not take down apps removed by the App Store or Play Store. It was reported that there had been over 10,000 pre-orders.

At this time, it was reported that the Freedom Phone was a white-label version of the Umidigi A9 Pro. Its OEM Android software was replaced by a custom Android distribution known as "Freedom OS", which is stated to contain code from LineageOS and GrapheneOS, and comes with apps such as DuckDuckGo, alt-tech platforms such as Parler and Rumble, and Telegram pre-installed. The device was promoted as including a feature known as "Trust", which is a LineageOS feature. It uses MicroG, an open source implementation of Google Play Services that is often used with custom distributions such as LineageOS. The PatriApp store is a rebranded version of Aurora Store—an alternative open source client for the Play Store—rather than an independent third-party app store as was implied in the device's marketing materials.

In a review of the product, CNET said that the US$500 Freedom Phone appeared to be "nearly on par with a $200 budget Android phone."; the Umidigi A9 Pro retails for $120 in comparison, a little less than a quarter the price. The Freedom Phone website did not initially publish specifications for the phone, but incomplete information was later published. Finman confirmed to The Daily Beast that the Freedom Phone was manufactured by Umidigi.

In August 2021, Finman announced that future models would have upgraded hardware, and replace Freedom OS with ClearCenter's Android-based Clear OS Mobile; he stated that Clear had better logistics, and experience in developing privacy-oriented smartphones. In January 2023, The Daily Beast reported that Finman and ClearCenter founder Michael Proper were ensnared in a legal battle over issues with the phone.

== See also ==
- Affinity fraud
- Secure telephone
- Trump Mobile
