= Social media as a public utility =

View of social media

Social media as a public utility is a theory postulating that social networking sites (such as Facebook, Instagram, YouTube, TikTok, Reddit, X, and Tumblr) are essential public services that should be regulated by the government, in a manner similar to how electric and phone utilities are typically government-regulated. It is based on the notion that social media platforms have monopoly power and broad social influence.

== Background ==
=== Definitions ===
Social media can be defined as a group of Internet-based applications that build on the ideological and technological foundations of Web 2.0, and that allow the creation and exchange of user-generated content. The New Zealand Government of Internal Affairs describes it as "a set of online technologies, sites, and practices which are used to share opinions, experiences and perspectives. Fundamentally it is about the conversation. In contrast with traditional media, the nature of social media is to be highly interactive". Furthermore, the term social media can be described as online tools that let people interact and communicate with each other. This has become a standard word for online cultural exchange and a dominant way for individuals to engage on the internet. By using social media, individuals become more closely and strongly connected than ever before.

The traditional definition of the term public utility is "an infrastructural necessity for the general public where the supply conditions are such that the public may not be provided with a reasonable service at reasonable prices because of monopoly in the area". Conventional public utilities include water, natural gas, and electricity. In order to secure the interests of the public, utilities are regulated. Public utilities can also be seen as natural monopolies implying that the highest degree of efficiency is accomplished under one operator in the marketplace. Public utility regulation for social media has been largely criticized because people believe it would produce undesirable and indirect effects. However, others say that truly effective government regulation would produce valuable results. Social media as a public utility is a crucial debate because utilities get regulated, so marking social media websites as such would require government regulation of various social media websites and platforms, major and minor ones alike.

Applying the concept of public utility to social media implies that such websites are public necessities, and, consequently, should be regulated by the government. While social media is not as essential for survival as traditional public utilities such as electricity, water, and natural gas, many people believe that it has become essential for living in an interconnected world and that, without it, living a successful life would be difficult. Therefore, many people believe that social media has reached utility status and should be treated as a public utility. However, others believe those assertions untrue because social media platforms mutate frequently, so giving such platforms "utility status" would result in government regulation, which would consequently hinder innovation. Over the past decade, many have debated and questioned whether Internet service providers should be considered essential facilities or natural monopolies and regulated as public utilities, just as electricity providers are.

=== Monopoly ===
A monopoly is a firm that is the sole seller of a product or service, having no close substitutes. A natural monopoly arises when the entire demand within a relevant market can be satisfied at lowest cost by one firm rather than by two or more, and if such a market contains more than one firm then the firms will "quickly shake down to one through mergers or failures, or production will continue to consume more resources than necessary". Under a monopoly, competition is said to be short-lived, whereas under a natural monopoly it is said to produce inefficient results. Public utility companies can be regulated to prevent them from gaining monopolistic control. In November 2011 AT&T's proposal for merging with T-Mobile was rejected because it would have "diminished competition", and have led to the company having monopolistic power within the telephone industry. Such regulation is permitted because the telephone industry is a public utility. Similarly, Microsoft has also been prevented from taking various business actions that could result in the company gaining monopolistic power. If social media were a public utility then regulation of Google and Facebook would similarly dictate what they could and could not do. The possibility was raised in 2018 by U.S. Representative Steve King during a House Judiciary hearing on social media filtering practices.

== Arguments ==
Advocates of this theory believe that social media websites already act like public utilities, and therefore regulation is needed. Additionally, advocates say that in the 21st century, using such websites are as necessary for communication as using traditional public utilities such as telephone, water, electricity, and natural gas are for other everyday uses. Specifically, advocates note that Google search should be treated as a public utility and needs to be regulated because it dominates the search engine market and no website can afford to ignore it. There is the position that a social media website such as Google "is a common carrier and should be regulated as such". These are reinforced by a perception that social media companies fail to properly maintain fair platforms for discourse.

=== Individual level ===
Advocates of regulating social media as a public utility believe that having an Internet presence using social media websites is imperative for individuals to adequately take part in the 21st century. Consequently, they argue that these sites are public utilities that need to be regulated to ensure that the constitutional rights of users are protected. For example, regulation may be needed to protect freedom of speech against risks such as Internet censorship and deplatforming.

Social media affects people's behavior. For instance, it plays an important role in shaping its users' decisions and actions pertaining to health. This is demonstrated in a Pew Research Center research, which showed that 72 percent of American adults turned to social media for health information in 2011. Around 70 percent of people with chronic illnesses also use the platform to find cure, diagnoses, and other health answers. This development becomes a public issue as social media are likely to provide wrong medical information. Additionally, social media sites can also facilitate deleterious health behavior such as smoking, drug use, and harmful sexual behavior.

An opinion article published on the Pirate Parties International website in February 2026 posited that some major social media platforms and even email services ought to be treated as effective utilities in order to protect digital heritages which in turn could address the issue of AI-powered disinformation.

=== Business level ===
Advocates of social media as a public utility maintain that social media services dominate the Internet and are mainly owned by three or four companies that have unparalleled power to shape user interaction, and because of this power such businesses need to be regulated as public utilities. Zeynep Tufekci, University of North Carolina Chapel Hill, claims that services on the Internet such as Google, eBay, Facebook, Amazon.com, are all natural monopolies. She has stated that these services "benefit greatly from network externalities[,] which means that the more people on the service, the more useful it is for everyone", and thus it is difficult to replace the market leader.

=== Government level ===
Advocates of social media as a public utility believe that the government should impose restrictions on social media websites, such as Google, that are designed to benefit its rivals. Due to the recent substantial growth of social media websites such as Google, advocates claim that such a website "might need search neutrality regulation modeled after net neutrality regulation and that a Federal Search Commission might be needed to enforce such a regime". danah boyd expresses a future issue which the government may have to deal with in her research: Facebook is becoming an international social media website, specifically prevalent in Canada and Europe which are "two regions that love to regulate their utilities". Furthermore, recent books by New America Foundation Senior Fellow Rebecca MacKinnon and law professor Lori Andrews advise society to start considering Facebook and Google as nation-states or the "sovereigns of cyberspace". Overall, advocates of social media as a public utility believe that due to the immense popularity and necessity of social media websites, it is imperative that the Government imposes regulations in the same manner they do for electricity, water, and natural gas.

== Counterarguments ==
Opponents of this theory say that social media websites should not be treated as public utilities because these platforms are changing every year, and because they are not essential services for survival as common public utilities are, such as water, natural gas, and electricity. Furthermore, opponents fear that imposing "utility" status on a social network site, and forcing regulation might lock such a site in as a real monopoly, which consequently, will stop innovation, and counteract competition. Opponents point out that because social media are constantly evolving, innovation and competition are necessary for its growth.

=== Individual level ===
On an individual level, opponents state that treating social media websites as regulated public utilities "would harm consumer welfare because public utility regulation has traditionally been the archenemy of innovation and competition". The Director of the Public Utility Research Center at University of Florida, Mark Jamison, points out that "our economies effectively shut down without traditional public utilities such as electricity, water, and natural gas because utilities occupy unique positions and provide public services (Glaeser 1927)" Opponents to social media as a public utility claim that our economy would not shut down without social media websites. Additionally, Mark Jamison brings up a situation in 2009 which illustrates how consumers can easily find alternatives to social media sites such as Google search. "For about an hour on the morning of January 31, 2009, Google search results contained a noticeable error. During that period of time a large number of customers switched their search activity to Yahoo! and probably to other search engines (Google 2009; Vascellaro 2009)". Such an incident shows that while social media sites are extremely popular, they are "not essential to our social and economic functions in the way that electricity and water are".

Additionally, opponents maintain that social media websites are relatively new, and that new ones continue to displace the old ones. Individuals are rapidly discovering new alternatives for social media websites. For example, opponents point out that MySpace was the market leader long before Facebook became active, and was expected to have continued success. However, once the platform Facebook was created, users jumped to this new social media website, and within a short period of time MySpace lost the majority of its users, was forced to cut costs, and therefore may disappear in the near future. Opponents say that due to such discoveries, social media are not public utilities because a utility is considered an "essential facility" that has no good alternatives.

=== Business level ===
On a business level, opponents fear that if social media websites become public utilities then providers of these sites will be treated as vital facilities and such a situation "threatens to convert predictions of "natural monopoly" into a self-fulfilling prophecy". Additionally, opponents to social media as a public utility believe that those who advocate regulation of social media websites such as Google "fail to give adequate weight to the changes that constantly occur in the search business, the ways that rivals benefit from Google’s investments, the negative impacts of forcing Google to reveal its search algorithms, and regulation’s stifling effect on innovation". Additionally, these opponents claim that because such websites and markets are constantly evolving, regulation would consequently be expensive. Specifically, Mark Jamison points out that the regulation of Google would be costly both in terms of the administrative costs and in terms of the delays in innovation that regulation would cause. Opponents to this theory also say that economic regulation of social media sites could decrease investment, and consequently harm customers and rivals. For example, if a social media site such as Google search were regulated, it could "result in at least partial public disclosure of Google’s search algorithms, which would allow other businesses to behave strategically to improve their search rankings without benefitting consumers". Furthermore, social media services are constantly evolving, and consequently, despite the massive user base that sites such as Facebook and Google have, opponents believe that the disappearance of these businesses are "only a masterpiece of software away". Traditional businesses classified as public utilities, such as water and electric companies have a monopoly over their services, making these business irreplaceable, and opponents maintain that such is not the case with social media websites.

=== Government level ===
Opponents to this theory believe that imposing utility status on social media websites would consequently cause government regulation, which could result in an unfair change for both businesses and individuals. For example suggested by such opponents is the fear that these websites would start to charge a fee in adjustment to the new rules imposed by the government. Mark Jamison points out in his research that government-imposed standards for presenting Google search results would halt innovation, "as happened in telecommunications, government oversight was imposed with the intention of protecting telephone companies’ rivals; instead, it delayed technological progress and decreased innovation". According to Adam Thierer, George Mason University, "social media sites are fundamentally tied up with the production and dissemination of speech and expression, First Amendment values are at stake, warranting heightened constitutional scrutiny of proposals for regulation." Thierer and other opponents to social media as a public utility believe that the providers of social media websites should have the right to decide how their own platforms are configured along with what content is allowed to appear on them, and that the government should not force such restrictions caused by regulation .

== See also ==
- Alt-tech
- Big Tech
- Common carrier
- Concentration of media ownership
- Democratic socialism
- Media regulation
- Monopolies of knowledge
- Nationalization
- Net neutrality
- Right to Internet access
- Social media use in politics
- State media
- Forum (legal)
  - Knight First Amendment Institute v. Trump
- Distributed social network
