= Rambach =

Rambach may refer to

- The Rom River in its South Tyrol stretches
- Rambach im Innkreis, another name for Rainbach im Innkreis
- Adalbert Rambach, a German author
- Amy Lynn Rambach Peikoff, a writer, blogger, and professor of philosophy and law
- Augustus Jacob Rambach, a German author
- Johann Jacob Rambach (18th c.), a German author
- Jörg Rambach, one of the alleged discoverers of the Kafkania pebble
- Karl Rambach (Latin: Carolus Rambach)
- Lynn Rambach Pressman Raymond
- Pierre Rambach, a French architect
