= Demonetization =

Demonetization may refer to one of the following:

- Demonetization (currency), the act of stripping a currency unit of its status as legal tender
- Demonetization (deplatforming), a form of deplatforming or content moderation
