= Amy Peikoff =

American journalist (born 1968)

- Born: Amy Lynn Rambach; June 7, 1968 (age 58)
- Education: University of California, Los Angeles (BSc, JD); Pepperdine University; University of Southern California (PhD)
- Occupations: Philosopher, lawyer, professor
- Writing career
- Subjects: Objectivism, privacy, intellectual property
- Website: dontletitgo.com

Amy Lynn Peikoff (/ˈpiːkɒf/; née Rambach; born June 7, 1968) is an American attorney, writer, podcaster, and a former professor of philosophy and law. Peikoff was the Chief Policy Officer of social media platforms Parler and BitChute.

== Early life and education ==
Amy Peikoff studied at the University of California, Los Angeles, where she earned her Bachelor of Science degree in Mathematics and Applied Science in 1992 and her Juris Doctor in 1998, having attended her first year of law school at Pepperdine University. She was an editor of the UCLA Law Review. She then earned her Doctor of Philosophy in Philosophy at the University of Southern California in 2003.

== Career ==
Amy Peikoff is a member of the State Bar of California, having been admitted in May 2002. Early in her career she worked with The Association for Objective Law, an organization that promotes Objectivism in the legal sector; her work with that organization included the submission of an amicus curiae brief in support of Elián González's right of residence in the United States.

Peikoff has taught law and philosophy at Southwestern Law School, Chapman University, the United States Air Force Academy, the University of North Carolina at Chapel Hill, and the University of Texas at Austin. She has also spoken to audiences at DePaul University and Stanford University. Her specialisms include privacy, introductory logic, intellectual property, and Objectivism.

She has contributed articles to the NYU Journal of Law & Liberty, The Virginia Journal of Social Policy and the Law, the Brandeis Law Journal, Philosophical Explorations, Ethics, The Philadelphia Inquirer, the Los Angeles Times, The Washington Times, and to books such as Essays on Ayn Rand's Anthem and Essays on Ayn Rand's The Fountainhead. She was interviewed for the 2011 documentary film, Ayn Rand & the Prophecy of Atlas Shrugged, and she was an occasional guest host of The Tammy Bruce Show. In a 2014 article for St. John's Law Review, Peikoff argues for overturning the third-party doctrine, which holds that people who voluntarily give information to third parties have "no reasonable expectation of privacy" in that information. Her argument, which derives from a legal model for privacy based on property rights and the common law of contract, would protect personal privacy but still allow government to use secret agents.

Peikoff runs an Objectivist blog and podcast called Don't Let It Go, named after an essay in Ayn Rand's Philosophy: Who Needs It. She previously also co-hosted the Yaron & Amy Show podcast with Yaron Brook.

As of September 2025, Amy Peikoff is an Attorney at Pacific Legal Foundation.

== Personal life ==
She is the ex-wife of fellow Objectivist scholar Leonard Peikoff and the ex-stepmother of novelist Kira Peikoff.

== See also ==
- American philosophy
- Ethical egoism
- Free market
- Objectivist movement
- Philosophical realism
- Rational egoism
