= Daryl Davis =

American musician, author, and activist (born 1958)

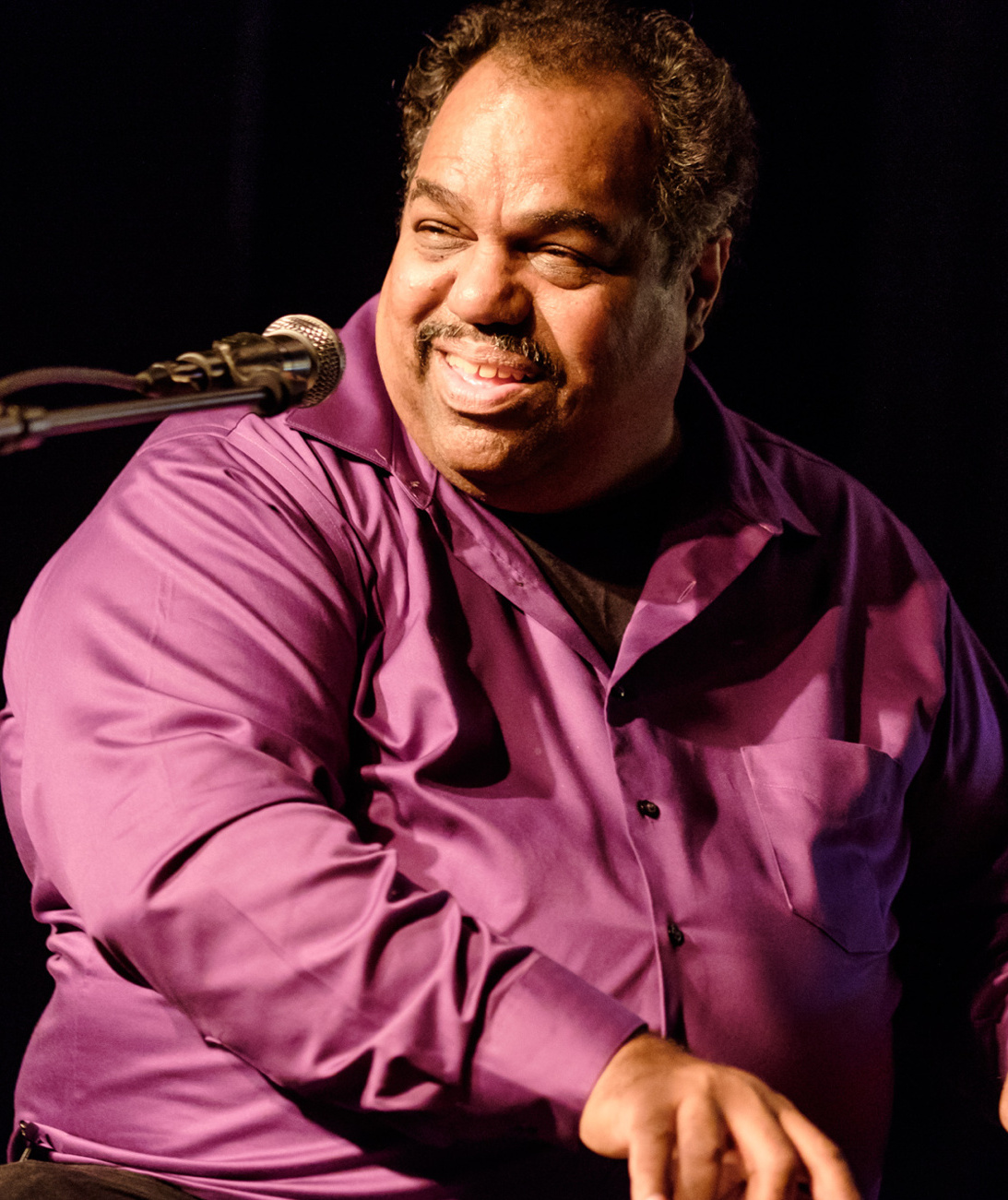
- Davis performing in 2017
- Born: March 26, 1958 (age 68); Chicago, Illinois, U.S.
- Education: Howard University (BMus)
- Occupations: Musician; author; actor
- Years active: 1980s–present
- Known for: Anti-racist activism; Accidental Courtesy; Changing Minds
- Musical career
- Genres: Piano blues; boogie-woogie; Delta blues; Chicago blues
- Instruments: Piano; vocals; keyboards; guitar
- Label: Lyrad
- Daryl Davis's voice Davis on how music led him to anti-racist activism Recorded January 17, 2025
- Website: daryldavis.com

Daryl Davis (born March 26, 1958) is an American R&B and blues musician and activist. His efforts to fight racism by engaging members of the Ku Klux Klan (KKK) have convinced dozens of Klansmen to leave and denounce the KKK. Known for his energetic style of boogie-woogie piano, Davis has played with such musicians as Chuck Berry, Jerry Lee Lewis, B. B. King, and Bruce Hornsby.

He is the subject of the 2016 documentary Accidental Courtesy: Daryl Davis, Race & America.

== Early life ==
Born in Chicago, Illinois, Davis was the son of a Department of State Foreign Service officer and moved around the world with his parents during most of his early childhood. Living in various foreign countries, including African nations, Davis grew accustomed to the casually integrated schools of foreign diplomats, where children of many nations, races, and cultures were schooled together. At the age of ten, he returned to the United States and joined what had previously been an all-white Cub Scout pack in Belmont, Massachusetts. During a local parade with his pack, he was carrying the flag when he was struck with rocks and bottles thrown from the crowd, prompting the pack leaders to form a protective ring around him. Davis did not understand the incident until he discussed it with his father. In this conversation, his father explained racism to him for the first time. The irrationality of the incident led to his curiosity about the origins and basis for racist attitudes, which would shape much of his future activity.

Davis is a Christian.

== Music career ==
Davis absorbed the style of blues musicians from the Mississippi Delta who had migrated north. In 1980, he earned a bachelor of music degree from Howard University, where he was a member of the Howard University Choir and Jazz Vocal Ensemble. Davis "was mentored by legendary pianists Pinetop Perkins and Johnnie Johnson, who both claimed him as their godson and praised his ability to master a piano style that was popular long before he was born", according to his Kennedy Center profile.

Davis has frequently played backup for Chuck Berry and Jerry Lee Lewis. He was a friend of Muddy Waters and played piano in the Legendary Blues Band. Davis has also performed with blues icon B. B. King. He has played with artists such as Elvis Presley's Jordanaires, the Platters, the Drifters, the Coasters, Bo Diddley, Percy Sledge, and Sam Moore (of Sam & Dave).

He was awarded "Best Traditional Blues/R&B Instrumentalist" at the 2009 Washington Area Music Awards. For several years, Davis served as artistic director of the Centrum Acoustic Blues Festival.

"Davis' piano work impresses with his winning combination of technique and abandon, and his vocals are strong and assured", wrote a reviewer in Living Blues Magazine.

=== Discography ===
- American Roots (2000)
- Alternate Routes (2008)
- Greatest Hits (2011)

== Activism ==
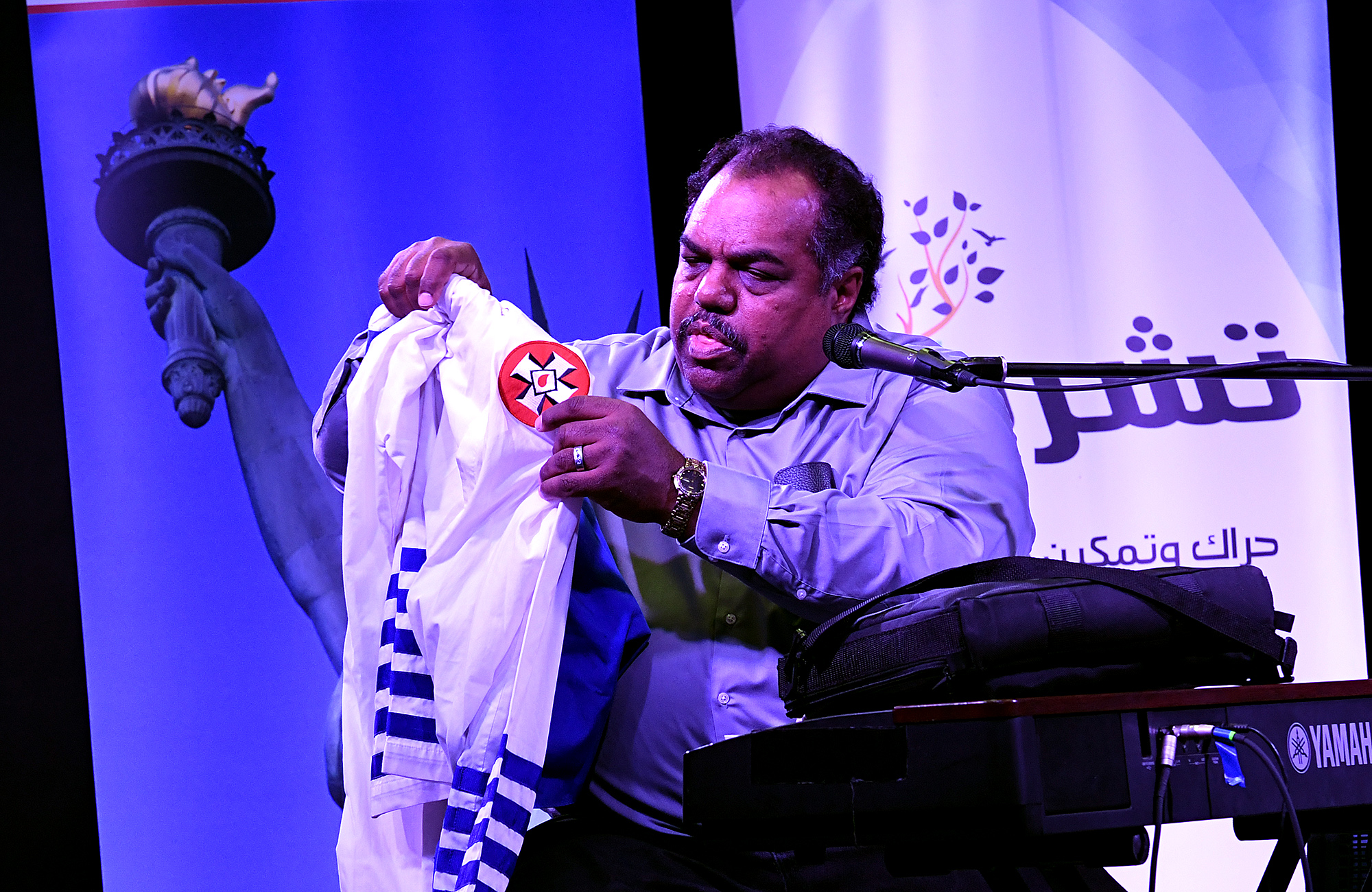
Davis holding up KKK robes at Blues and Rock for Humanity in November 2017

What I have come to find to be the greatest and most effective and successful weapon that we can use, known to man, to combat such adversaries as ignorance, racism, hatred, violence, is also the least expensive weapon, and the one that is the least used by Americans. That weapon is called communication.

— Daryl Davis, "Klan We Talk?", TEDxCapeMay, 9 January 2018.

Davis has worked to improve race relations by seeking out, engaging in dialogue with, and befriending members of the Ku Klux Klan. In 1983, he was playing country western music in a "white" bar in Frederick, Maryland, when a patron came up to him and said it was the first time he had "heard a black man play as well as Jerry Lee Lewis". Davis explained to the man that "Jerry Lee learned to play from black blues and boogie-woogie piano players and he's a friend of mine". The white patron was skeptical and over a drink admitted he was a member of the KKK. The two became friends and eventually the man gave Davis contact information on KKK leaders.

A few years later, Davis decided that he wanted to interview Klan members and write a book on the subject, to answer a "question in my head from the age of 10: 'Why do you hate me when you know nothing about me?' That question had never been answered from my youth".

In meeting with the Imperial Wizard of the KKK in Maryland, Roger Kelly, Davis concealed his race before the interview.

My secretary called him, and I told her, 'do not tell Roger Kelly I'm black. Just tell him I am writing a book on the Klan'. I wanted her to call because she's white. I knew enough about the mentality of the Klan that they would never think a white woman would work for a black man. She called him and he didn't ask what color I was, so we arranged to meet at a motel.

The meeting was tense. Kelly arrived at the motel with a bodyguard armed with a gun. Davis eventually became friends with Kelly and was later invited to be Kelly's daughter's godfather. When Kelly left the Klan, he gave his robe to Davis.

Davis eventually went on to befriend over twenty members of the KKK, and claims to have been directly responsible for between forty and sixty, and indirectly over two hundred people leaving the Klan. Over the course of his activities, Davis found that Klansmen have many misconceptions about black people, stemming mostly from intense brainwashing in their youth. When they got to know him, Davis claims, it was more difficult to maintain their prejudices. He recounted his experiences in his 1998 book, Klan-destine Relationships: A Black Man's Odyssey in the Ku Klux Klan.

Klan members have often invited Davis to meetings, and they have given him their robes and hoods. In 2016, Davis estimated having collected 25 or 26 robes. According to The Washington Post, among the "Knights of the Ku Klux Klan" he interviewed were Grand Klaliff Chester Doles, Grand Giant Tony LaRicci, and Grand Giant Bob White. One Klan member supposedly gave Davis a medallion stamped with the words "KKK—Member in good standing".

Davis claims to be responsible for helping to dismantle the KKK in Maryland because things "fell apart" after he began making inroads with its members there. However, since then, the KKK was rebuilt in Maryland under Richard Preston, leader of the Confederate White Knights, who was arrested for firing his gun at counterprotesters at the 2017 Unite the Right rally. Davis offered to post Preston's bail. He later took Preston to the National Museum of African American History. Shortly thereafter, he was asked to give away the bride at Preston's wedding.

"The lesson learned is: ignorance breeds fear", says Davis. "If you don't keep that fear in check, that fear will breed hatred. If you don't keep hatred in check, it will breed destruction".

Chester Doles, a member of the Klan, was convinced that Davis was a spy for the Anti-Defamation League or some other Klan-buster, and some of Davis's friends have found his fascination with the Klan to be odd. "He's attracted to controversy", says Adolph Wright, an old friend and fellow musician who believes Davis is a bit eccentric. "When the crowd goes right, he goes left", Wright told the Post.

Davis's father, retired senior Foreign Service officer William B. Davis, believed that his son engaged with the Klan because he needed to make sense of their hatred, to seek common ground. He remarked to The Washington Post that his son "has done something that I don't know any other black American, or white American, has done".

=== Accidental Courtesy documentary ===
In the 2016 documentary film Accidental Courtesy: Daryl Davis, Race & America, Davis interacts with KKK members and white supremacists, and provides contrasting views of his activities from members of the Southern Poverty Law Center and Black Lives Matter.

=== Minds social network ===
Daryl Davis is an official advisor to the decentralized social network Minds. He uses the platform to educate people on how to conduct civil discourse to find common ground and build tolerance.

In an interview with Forbes, Davis said "…here [at Minds] you have an open forum where people are welcomed to bring their diverse ideas, even their beliefs, which people may not find popular and have civil discourse…the art of conversing with one another has been lost… This forum will allow people to come on there and be able to be transparent, to have conversation unlike some of the other platforms on the internet".

Davis believes education is the best remedy for curing hate: "[If] you fix the ignorance, there's nothing to fear. If there's nothing to fear, there's nothing to hate. If there's nothing to hate, there's nothing or no one to destroy".

In November 2019, Minds and Davis launched the Deradicalization Initiative to combat online extremism. In addition to workshops, meetups, and other live events, the initiative offers educational resources and ideas for promoting tolerance.

=== Changing Minds podcast ===
As part of the Deradicalization Initiative, Davis runs a podcast called Changing Minds. The show covers a wide range of topics, including politics, music, and race. Guests are equally diverse and have included notable figures such as:

- Former Ku Klux Klan Imperial Wizard Scott Shepherd.
- Former al-Qaeda recruiter Jesse Morton.
- David Kaczynski, brother of "Unabomber" Ted Kaczynski
- Charles Berry Jr., Chuck Berry's son.
- Blues guitarist Bob Margolin
- Documentary film director and human rights activist Deeyah Khan
- Journalist and author Brian Karem

== Acting ==
Davis has acted on stage, film, and television. He played a minor character in HBO's television series The Wire. He appeared on stage in William Saroyan's The Time of Your Life with Marcia Gay Harden, Brigid Cleary, and Richard Bauer, and in Elvis Mania at an off-Broadway theater in New York City. He received positive reviews for his role in Zora Neale Hurston's Polk County.
