= SkySilk Cloud Services =

American web infrastructure company

SkySilk Cloud Services is an American web infrastructure company based in Los Angeles. According to Data Center Dynamics, SkySilk has points of presence in both Los Angeles and New York. SkySilk appears to be hosted by a facility in Los Angeles operated by data-center provider QuadraNet.

In February 2021, they took over the hosting of the controversial social media network Parler. In relation to their hosting of Parler, SkySilk representatives said that "Skysilk does not advocate nor condone hate, rather, it advocates the right to private judgment and rejects the role of being the judge, jury, and executioner." According to Ars Technica, Parler's traffic from SkySilk passes through an ISP based in Ohio called CloudRoute. Ars Technica reported that "CloudRoute and SkySilk seem to be connected in some way and may ultimately be part of the same company", though they noted the CEO of CloudRoute denied such a connection.
