= Accidental Courtesy: Daryl Davis, Race & America =

- Directed by: Matthew Ornstein
- Screenplay by: Daryl Davis
- Produced by: Matthew Ornstein
- Release date: March 13, 2016
- Running time: 96 minutes
- Country: United States
- Language: English

Accidental Courtesy: Daryl Davis, Race & America is a 2016 American documentary film directed and produced by Matthew Ornstein.

== Content ==
The film follows Daryl Davis meeting members, and former members, of the Ku Klux Klan and the National Socialist Movement, and provides contrasting views of his activities from members of the Southern Poverty Law Center and Black Lives Matter.

Davis recounts befriending many klansmen and how some have left the klan. Several, upon leaving the hate group, give him their robe. Davis estimates having collected over 25 robes.

== Distribution ==
The film debuted on the PBS TV series Independent Lens. The film was shown on PBS on February 13, 2017, and rerun thereafter.

== Aftermath ==
Frank Ancona, the Klansman depicted at the opening and close of the documentary film Accidental Courtesy, was found shot dead in Missouri on February 11, 2017, two days before the airing of the film. Ancona's wife and step-son were both charged with the murder.
