= Wimkin =

Free speech social network

- Website type: Social network
- Available in: English
- Founder: Jason Sheppard
- Industry: Internet
- Website: wimkin.com
- Users: 7,900,000 (total) as of October of 2022 (550,000 daily active)
- Launched: August 2020

Wimkin is an alt-tech social network that claims to promote free speech. The site describes itself as "100% uncensored social media". Wimkin was launched in August 2020 and was founded by Jason Sheppard.

As of January 2021, Wimkin had 300,000 users.

== History ==
Wimkin launched in August 2020 after being founded by Jason Sheppard.

On January 12, 2021, Apple removed Wimkin from the Apple App Store for hosting violent content, including calls for a civil war and the arrest of then-Vice President Mike Pence. Sheppard stated that Wimkin had removed the violent content after Apple reported it to them. However, Apple claimed that they "continued to find direct threats of violence and calls to incite lawless action" on Wimkin. After Wimkin was removed from the App Store, Wimkin's website was hit with a DDoS attack.

Google subsequently removed Wimkin from the Google Play Store, with a Google spokesperson saying of the ban that, "We don't allow apps that depict or facilitate gratuitous violence or other dangerous activities." In response, Sheppard accused Google of treating Wimkin unfairly, stating in an email that, "We're being treated entirely unfairly and if we aren't reinstated when we've worked tirelessly to comply and become a better platform, we will be seeking legal remedy to at the very least, shed some light into this tyrannical monopoly."

In a message on Wimkin's website following the removals, the company said that "We are working on getting back in both Apple Store and Google Play." Wimkin has since returned to both the App Store and Google Play.

After Parler, another social network, was pulled offline by its host Amazon Web Services on January 11, former users of that site started migrating to Wimkin. In the twelve days following the storming of the United States Capitol, Wimkin claimed that its userbase had grown by 20 percent, amounting to around 55,000 new users.

== Users and content ==
While Wimkin has groups relating to mundane topics, such as pets and traveling, Wimkin also has groups relating to fringe content, such as the far-right conspiracy theory QAnon. There were also posts and a group on Wimkin attempting to organize a "Million Militia March" for January 20, 2021 on Inauguration Day, but the posts and group were removed.

In January 2021, David Eberti of The Wall Street Journal found posts on Wimkin comparing Democrats with Nazis and a meme saying "If you don't believe in violence, get ready to hide behind someone who does."

Wimkin prohibits pornography, nudity, harassment, and inciting violence. The site also does not fact-check posts.

== Reception ==
In January 2021, Chris Tye from WBBM-TV described Wimkin as a platform "used by members of the so-called Trump celebrity class." Also in January, Anthony Cuthbertson of The Independent called Wimkin "yet another social media app popular with far right users".

== Design ==
According to SFGate, Wimkin functions like a combination of Twitter and Facebook, with users of the site being allowed to post to a wider audience, comment and like other posts, and join groups.
