= Philosophical Explorations =

- Discipline: Philosophy
- Language: English
- Edited by: Annemarie Kalis and Léon de Bruin

Publication details
- History: 1998–present
- Publisher: Taylor and Francis (United Kingdom)
- Frequency: Triannually

Standard abbreviations
- ISO 4: Philos. Explor.

Indexing
- ISSN: 1386-9795 (print); 1741-5918 (web)
- LCCN: 2001233142
- OCLC no.: 901011239

Links
- Journal homepage; Online archive

Philosophical Explorations is a peer reviewed philosophy journal published triannually, specializing in the philosophy of mind and action.

The editors of this journal intend to "publish outstanding articles in the philosophy of mind and action, with an emphasis on issues concerning the interrelations between cognition and agency." They are particularly interested in publishing articles on "philosophy of mind and action and related disciplines such as moral psychology, ethics, philosophical anthropology, social philosophy, political philosophy and philosophy of the social sciences....[and] interdisciplinary [work], establishing bridges between philosophy and, for example, evolutionary biology, neuroscience, psychology, and political science. In 2010, the journal initiated the Philosophical Explorations Essay Prize.

The current editors-in-chief are Annemarie Kalis and Léon de Bruin.

Submissions to Philosophical Explorations are screened by the (associate) editors and undergo double blind peer review by at least two referees before being accepted for publication.
