= Umidigi =

Chinese mobile phone manufacturer

Umidigi Inc.
- Trade name: UMIDIGI
- Formerly: UMI (2012–2017)
- Industry: Consumer electronics, specifically smartphones
- Founded: February 2012; 14 years ago
- Headquarters: Shenzhen, Guangdong, China
- Area served: Worldwide
- Website: umidigi.com

UMIDIGI, formerly known as UMI, is a Chinese consumer electronics manufacturer based in Shenzhen, Guangdong. Established in February 2012, the company made its debut in July of that same year with the launch of their first phone, the UMI X1.

== Products ==
UMIDIGI has introduced more than 55 phone models. In addition to phones, the company also has a range of mobile phone accessories, such as wireless earphones, smartwatches, a Bluetooth selfie stick/tripod combo, and a wireless charging pad. Some of these accessories go under brand names such as Ubeats, Upod, and Uwatch.

In Bangladesh, UMIDIGI is partnering with Redgreen in order to expand its presence in the region.

A version of the UMIDIGI A9 was sold in the United States as the "Freedom Phone."

== Smartphones ==
Model	Dimensions (WxHxT mm)	Weight	Display	Resolution	Internal Storage	Memory	Rear Camera/s	Front Camera	Battery	Processor	Operating System	Release date YY.MM
X1	68.0 x 129.0 x 8.5	125 g	4.5" IPS Capacitive	720 x 1280	4 GB	1 GB	8 MP	2.1 MP	1750 mAh	2 cores 1.0 GHz	4.1.1 Jelly Bean	2012.10
X2	70.0 x 141.0 x 8.9	155 g	5.0" IPS Capacitive	1080 x 1920	32 GB	1 GB	12.58 MP	2 MP	2500 mAh	4 cores 1.5 GHz	4.1.2 Jelly Bean	2013.03
Cross	90.0 x 174.0 x 9.0	232 g	6.4" IPS Capacitive	1080 x 1920	32 GB	2 GB	12.8 MP	8 MP	4180 mAh	4 cores 1.5 GHz	4.2.1 Jelly Bean	2013.12
X2S	70.0 x 141.0 x 8.9	169 g	5.0" IPS Capacitive	1080 x 1920	32 GB	2 GB	13.13 MP	2 MP	2500 mAh	8 cores 1.7 GHz	4.2.2 Jelly Bean	2013.12
X3	76.5 x 154.0 x 8.1	186 g	5.5" IPS Capacitive	1080 x 1920	16 GB	2 GB	13 MP	8 MP	3150 mAh	8 cores 1.66 GHz	4.2.2 Jelly Bean	2014.02
X1 Pro	69.0 x 139.0 x 9.3	156 g	4.7" IPS Capacitive	720 x 1280	4 GB	1 GB	4.92 MP	0.3 MP	2150 mAh	4 cores 1.4 GHz	4.2.2 Jelly Bean	2014.03
C1	76.5 x 154.5 x 7.9	160 g	5.5" IPS Capacitive	720 x 1280	16 GB	1 GB	8 MP	1.9 MP	2430 mAh	4 cores 1.3 GHz	4.4.2 KitKat	2014.07
Zero	70.5 x 146.0 x 6.4	145 g	5.0" Super AMOLED	1080 x 1920	16 GB	2 GB	12.78 MP	7.99 MP	2780 mAh	8 cores 2.0 GHz	4.4.2 KitKat	2014.10
Zero 2	76.2 x 152.6 x 8.0	150 g	5.2" Super AMOLED	1080 x 1920	16 GB	3 GB	13 MP	8 MP	3350 mAh	4 cores 1.7 GHz	5.1 Lollipop	2014.10
Hammer	71.6 x 144.0 x 7.9	168 g	5.0" TFT Capacitive	720 x 1280	16 GB	2 GB	13 MP	3.1 MP	2250 mAh	4 cores 1.5 GHz	4.4.2 KitKat	2015.04
eMAX												
Iron	76.5 x 152.3 x 7.9	148 g	5.5" TFT Capacitive	1080 x 1920	16 GB	3 GB	13 MP	8 MP	3350 mAh	8 cores 1.5 GHz	5.1 Lollipop	2015.06
Hammer S	77.4 x 154.0 x 8.5	200 g	5.5" IPS Capacitive	720 x 1280	16 GB	2 GB	13 MP	1.9 MP	3200 mAh	4 cores 1.0 GHz	5.1 Lollipop	2015.09
Fair	72.0 x 143.0 x 8.4	144 g	5.0" IPS	720 x 1280	8 GB	1 GB	13 MP	2 MP	2000 mAh	4 cores 1.0 GHz	5.1 Lollipop	2015.09
Iron Pro	76.5 x 152.3 x 7.9	148 g	5.5" IPS	1080 x 1920	16 GB	3 GB	13 MP	8 MP	3100 mAh	8 cores 1.3 GHz	5.1 Lollipop	2015.09
eMAX Mini												2015.08
Rome												2015.11
Touch												2015.12
Rome X												2015.09
Touch X												2016.04
Super												2016.05
London												2016.06
Max												2016.08
Plus												2016.09
Diamond												2016.10
Diamond X												2016.11
Plus E												2016.10
Z				1080 x 1920	32 GB	4 GB	13 MP	13 MP	3750 mAh	10 cores 2.6 GHz	6.0 Marshmallow	2016.12
Z Pro	76.8 x 154.6 x 8.2	175 g	5.5" IPS	1080 x 1920	32 GB	4 GB	13 MP + 13 MP	13 MP	3780 mAh	10 cores 2.6 GHz	6.0 Marshmallow	2017.02
C Note												2017.03
G												2017.05
Z1	76.0 x 154.0 x 8.2	173 g	5.5" IPS	1080 x 1920	64 GB	6 GB	13 MP	5 MP	3820 mAh	8 cores 2.3 GHz	7.0 Nougat	2017.06
Z1 Pro	76.0 x 154.0 x 7.0	154 g	5.5"	1080 x 1920	64 GB	6 GB	13 MP	5 MP	3779 mAh	8 cores 2.3 GHz	7.0 Nougat	2017.06
C Note 2	76.5 x 155.8 x 8.0	160 g	5.5"	1080 x 1920	64 GB	4 GB	13 MP	5 MP	4000 mAh	8 cores 1.5 GHz	7.0 Nougat	2017.06
S	75.6 x 154.9 x 8.5	167 g	5.5"	1080 x 1920	64 GB	4 GB	13 MP	5 MP	4000 mAh	8 cores 2.4 GHz	7.0 Nougat	2017.07
C2												2017.07
Crystal												2017.06
S2	75.0 x 158.0 x 8.9	185 g	6.0" IPS Capacitive	720 x 1440	64 GB	4 GB	13 MP	5 MP	5100 mAh	8 cores 2.3 GHz	6.0 Marshmallow	2017.08
S2 Pro	74.6 x 158.1 x 8.8	186 g	6.0"	1080 x 2160	128 GB	6 GB	13 MP	16 MP	5100 mAh	8 cores 2.6 GHz	7.0 Nougat	2017.08
A1	69.1 x 145.3 x 8.9	173 g	5.5"	720 x 1440	16 GB	3 GB	13 MP	5 MP	3150 mAh	4 cores 1.5 GHz	8.1 Oreo	2018.04
Z2/Z2 pro	74.4 x 153.4 x 8.3	165 g	6.2"	1080 x 2246	64 GB	6 GB	16 MP + 8 MP	16 MP + 8 MP	3850 mAh	8 cores 2.0 GHz	8.1 Oreo	2018.07
One	71.4 x 148.4 x 8.3	165 g	5.9''	720 x 1520	32 GB	4 GB	12 MP + 5 MP	16 MP	3250 mAh	8 cores 1.5 GHz	8.1 Oreo	2018.08
One Pro	71.4 x 148.4 x 8.3	165 g	5.9''	720 x 1520	64 GB	4 GB	12 MP + 5 MP	16 MP	3250 mAh	8 cores 1.5 GHz	8.1 Oreo	2018.08
Z2 Special Edition	74.4 x 153.4 x 8.3	165 g	6.2"	1080 x 2246	64 GB	4 GB	16 MP + 8 MP	16 MP + 8 MP	3850 mAh	8 cores 2.0 GHz	8.1 Oreo	2018.06
A3	70.2 x 147.2 x 8.5	186 g	5.5"	720 x 1440	16 GB	2 GB	12 MP + 5 MP	8 MP	3300 mAh	4 cores 1.5 GHz	8.1 Oreo	2018.09
A3 Pro	70.2 x 147.2 x 8.5	187 g	5.7"	720 x 1512	32 GB	3 GB	12 MP + 5 MP	8 MP	3300 mAh	4 cores 1.5 GHz	8.1 Oreo	2018.09
One Max	75.6 x 156.8 x 8.4	180 g	6.3"	720 x 1520	128 GB	4 GB	12 MP + 5 MP	16 MP	4150 mAh	8 cores 4 2.0 GHz	8.1 Oreo	2018.12
One Max Infinite display (Lite)	75.6 x 156.8 x 8.4	180 g	5.5"	720 x 1520	32 GB	4 GB	12 MP + 5 MP	16 MP	4000 mAh	8 cores 4 2.0 GHz	8.1 Oreo	2018.12
S3 Pro	74.7 x 157.0 x 8.5	217 g	6.3"	1080 x 2340	128 GB	6 GB	48 MP + 12 MP	20 MP	5150 mAh	4x Cortex-A73 2.1 GHz & 4x Cortex-A53 2.0 GHz	9.0 Pie	2019.02
F1 Play	74.3 x 156.9 x 8.8	193 g	6.3"	1080 x 2340	64 GB	6 GB	48 MP + 8 MP	16 MP	5150 mAh	4x Cortex-A73 2.0 GHz & 4x Cortex-A53 2.0 GHz	9.0 Pie	2019.03
Power	74.5 x 157.0 x 8.8	190 g	6.3"	1080 x 2340	64 GB	4 GB	16 MP + 5 MP	16 MP	5150 mAh	8x Cortex-A53 up to 2.3 GHz	9.0 Pie	2019.04
A5 Pro	75.9 x 156.0 x 8.2	203 g	6.3"	1080 x 2280	32 GB	4 GB	16 MP + 8 MP + 5 MP	16 MP	4150 mAh	4x Cortex-A53 2.0 GHz & 4x Cortex-A53 1.5 GHz	9.0 Pie	2019.04
X	75.59 x 158.6 x 8.1	202 g	6.35" AMOLED	720 x 1548	128 GB	4 GB	48 MP + 8 MP + 5 MP	8 MP	4150 mAh	4x Cortex-A73 2.1 GHz & 4x Cortex-A53 1.95 GHz	9.0 Pie	2019.08
F2	77. 7 x 162.6 x 8.7	215 g	6.53"	1080 x 2340	128 GB	6 GB	48 MP + 13 MP + 5 MP + 5MP	32 MP	5150 mAh	4x Cortex-A73 2.0 GHz & 4x Cortex-A53 2.0 GHz	10	2019.10
Power 3	77. 2 x 162.1 x 10.3	228 g	6.53"	1080 x 2340	64 GB	4 GB	48 MP + 13 MP + 5 MP + 5MP	16 MP	6150 mAh	4x Cortex-A73 2.0 GHz & 4x Cortex-A53 2.0 GHz	10	2019.11
A7 Pro	158.7 x 74.9 x 8.5 mm	212 g	6.3"	1080 x 2340	64/128 GB	4 GB	16 Mp + 16 MP + 5 MP + 5 MP	16 MP	4150 mAh	4x Cortex-A53, 2.0 GHz & 4x Cortex-A53, 1.5 GHz	10	2020.04
Bison	79.9 x 162.5 x 18mn	250g	6.3" IPS	1080 x 2340	128 GB	6/8 GB	48 MP + 16 MP + 5 MP + 5 MP	24 MP	5000 mAh	4x Cortex-A73 2.1 GHz & 4x Cortex-A53 2.00 GHz	10/11	2020.08
A9 Pro	158.7 x 74.9 x 8.6 mm	205 g	6.3" LTPS	1080 x 2340	64/128 GB	4/6 GB	48/32 Mp + 16 MP + 5 MP + 5 MP	24 MP	4150 mAh	4x Cortex-A73, 2.0 GHz & 4x Cortex-A53, 1.8 GHz	10	2020.09
G1 Tablet	244.8 * 162.2 * 9.3mm	576g	10.1"	1200 x 800	64 GB	4 GB	8 MP	8 MP	6,000 mAh	Quad-core Rockchip RK3562 @ 2 GHz	13	2023.07

== Controversy ==
In 2021, UMIDIGI sparked controversy after allegedly violating the GPLv2 license. When a developer requested the Linux kernel source code for the UMIDIGI F2, the company directed them to its Shenzhen office, implying that they would need to obtain the code in person. This response was widely perceived as impractical due to language barriers and was criticized by some as obstructive to international developers who could not speak Chinese. To assist the developer, a tech blogger later visited the Shenzhen office but found that the employee involved had already left the company, and no one ultimately took responsibility for the matter.
