= Alt-tech =

Internet platforms favored by the alt-right

Alt-tech is a collection of social networking, online video, blogging and other platforms and services that provide alternatives to "Big Tech" platforms and services. The "alt-" prefix alludes to the alt-right movement.

Alt-tech platforms employ looser content moderation and stronger privacy protections than mainstream platforms. They describe themselves as protectors of free speech and individual liberty, though some researchers have also pointed out such platforms' potential use for recruitment and mobilization by extremist groups.

== History ==
=== Early history ===
Alt-tech websites were first described in the 2010s. Starting around 2015, some prominent conservatives and their supporters began to use alt-tech platforms because they had been banned from other social media platforms. They became popular leading up to the early 2020s due to deplatforming, banning (including shadow banning), and other restrictions imposed on extremists by Big Tech companies. Some right-wing groups claim that these companies censor their views. After the Unite the Right rally in August 2017, technology companies such as Google, Facebook, and Twitter were criticized for deplatforming white supremacists. Hope not Hate researcher Joe Mulhall identified the deplatforming of Britain First in 2018, and Tommy Robinson in 2019, as two major events that spurred British social media users to join alternative platforms. Ethan Zuckerman and Chand Rajendra-Nicolucci further referenced the August 2018 deplatforming of conspiracy theorist Alex Jones as a pivotal moment.

In October 2018, alt-tech platform Gab received extensive public scrutiny following the Pittsburgh synagogue shooting, after it was found that the sole suspect of the attack, Robert Gregory Bowers, had posted a message on Gab before the shooting, indicating an immediate intent to cause harm. Bowers had a history of making extreme, antisemitic postings on the site. After the shooting, Gab briefly went offline when it was dropped by its hosting provider and denied service by several payment processors.

=== Surge following January 6 attack ===
The popularity of alt-tech platforms surged in January 2021, when United States president Donald Trump, and many of his prominent followers, were suspended from Twitter and other platforms. Parler, a website with a large proportion of Trump supporters among its user base, was taken offline when Amazon Web Services suspended its hosting several days after the January 6 storming of the United States Capitol. It was restarted with a new host on February 15, 2021.

In July 2021, an example of alt-tech hardware was announced: the "Freedom Phone" – a smartphone that promoted privacy-oriented features and an "uncensorable" app store. It was found that the device was merely a white-label version of a Chinese smartphone produced by Umidigi, with a modified Android firmware pre-loaded with apps popular among the target audience, and a rebranded version of an open source client for Google Play Store (rather than the independent app store implied in its promotional materials).

By 2022, The New York Times and The Guardian described a crowded marketplace of alt-tech platforms. The Times noted that alt-tech platforms claiming censorship by Twitter – such as Gettr, Parler, and Rumble – have mostly advertised themselves on Twitter.

In February 2022, Trump launched a Twitter alternative, Truth Social, after establishing a messaging platform outside of Twitter, such as a now discontinued Trump blog. During development, Truth Social did not at first acknowledge using Mastodon's open source code, and was given an ultimatum by Mastodon, quietly admitting to the use of Mastodon code later on. Truth Social's launch was accompanied by substantial technical difficulties. The platform's terms of service include an incongruous clause that users may not "disparage, tarnish, or otherwise harm, in our opinion, us and/or the Site." According to a report from consumer rights group Public Citizen, alt tech platforms with a supposed focus on free speech include the censorship of some liberal and conservative viewpoints, as well as the routine content moderation on other platforms, creating an "echo chamber". Based on the report, Truth Social was found to shadowban users that disagree with the site's narrative as well as a swathe of other content including some conservative content. "Truth Social" has banned content mentioning liberal views on abortion and the Congressional hearings on the January 6th Capitol attack.

== Research ==
Deen Freelon and colleagues, publishing in Science in September 2020, wrote that some alt-tech websites are specifically dedicated to serving right-wing communities, naming 4chan (founded in 2003), 8chan (2013), Gab (2016), BitChute (2017) and Parler (2018) as examples. They noted that others were more ideologically neutral, such as Discord and Telegram. Discord and Telegram have been used by QAnon conspiracy theorists to promote terrorism, which contributed to the January 6th attack. Discord later worked to remove right-wing extremists from its user base, and became a more mainstream platform. Joe Mulhall, a senior researcher for the UK anti-racism organization Hope not Hate, also distinguishes groups of alt-tech platforms: he says that some of them, such as DLive and Telegram, are "co-opted platforms" which have become widely popular among the far-right because of their minimal moderation; others including BitChute, Gab, and Parler are "bespoke platforms" which were created by people who themselves have "far-right leanings". Ethan Zuckerman and Chand Rajendra-Nicolucci, in contrast, described alt-tech services in explicitly political terms in a 2021 article for the Knight First Amendment Institute at Columbia University:

We use the alt-tech term to refer to platforms that offer a promise of uncensored speech, which exist specifically to give a space for far-right, nationalist, racist, or extremist points of view, and which harbor a broad sense of grievance that speech has been "censored" for failure to be "politically correct." Many, but not all of these alt-tech sites are far-right communities.

— Ethan Zuckerman and Chand Rajendra-Nicolucci

Researchers have also found that alt-tech platforms can also be used by far-right extremists for mobilization and recruitment purposes, which is more dangerous than just spreading their viewpoints.

Austrian researcher Julia Ebner has described alt-tech platforms as "ultra-libertarian".

== Platforms ==
=== List of alt-tech platforms ===
Type	Company	Citations	Active
Microblogging	Gab		Yes
Microblogging	Gettr		Yes
Microblogging	Parler		Yes
Microblogging	Truth Social		Yes
Online video platform	BitChute		Yes
Online video platform	DLive		No
Online video platform	Odysee		Yes
Online video platform	PewTube		No
Online video platform	Rumble		Yes
Online video platform	TokenTube		
Online video platform	DTube		Yes
Online video platform	Triller		Yes
Crowdfunding	GiveSendGo		Yes
Crowdfunding	Hatreon		No
Crowdfunding	SubscribeStar		
Crowdfunding	WeSearchr		No
Crowdfunding	GoyFundMe		No
Social networking service	MeWe		Yes
Social networking service	Minds		Yes
Social networking service	Slug		
Social networking service	Telegram		Yes
Social networking service	Thinkspot		Yes
Social networking service	WrongThink		
News aggregator	Patriots.win		Yes
News aggregator	Voat		No
Wiki encyclopedia	Infogalactic		Yes
Wiki encyclopedia	Metapedia		Yes
Wiki encyclopedia	Grokipedia		Yes
Imageboard	8kun		Yes
Online dating service	WASP Love		Yes
Online dating service	The Right Stuff		No
Domain name registrar and web hosting	Epik		Yes
Civic engagement platform	CloutHub		

== See also ==
- Big Tech
- Deplatforming
- Freedom of speech
- Platform economy
- Surveillance capitalism
- Technology and society
