= Deplatforming =

Denying access to a platform to express opinions

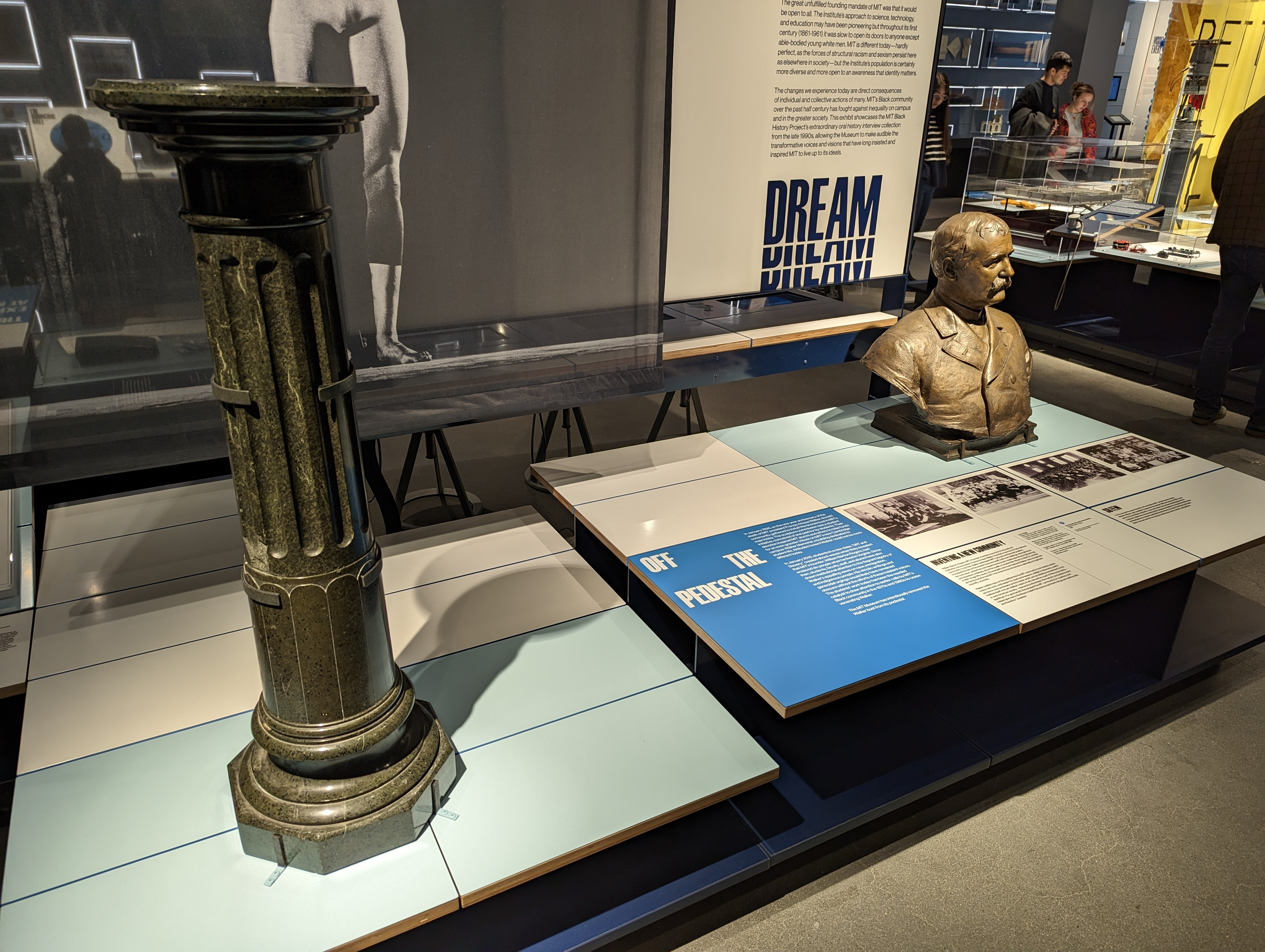
A bust of MIT president Francis Amasa Walker separated from its pedestal at the MIT Museum

Deplatforming, also known as no-platforming, is a boycott on an individual or group by removing the platforms used to share their information or ideas. The term is commonly associated with social media.

== History ==
=== Deplatforming of invited speakers ===
In the United States, the banning of speakers on university campuses dates back to the 1940s. This was carried out by the policies of the universities themselves. The University of California had a policy known as the Speaker Ban, codified in university regulations under President Robert Gordon Sproul, that mostly, but not exclusively, targeted communists. One rule stated that "the University assumed the right to prevent exploitation of its prestige by unqualified persons or by those who would use it as a platform for propaganda". This rule was used in 1951 to block Max Shachtman, a socialist, from speaking at the University of California at Berkeley. In 1947, former U.S. Vice President Henry A. Wallace was banned from speaking at UCLA because of his views on U.S. Cold War policy, and in 1961, Malcolm X was prohibited from speaking at Berkeley as a religious leader.

Controversial speakers invited to appear on college campuses have faced deplatforming attempts to disinvite them or to otherwise prevent them from speaking. The British National Union of Students established its No Platform policy as early as 1973. In the mid-1980s, visits by South African ambassador Glenn Babb to Canadian college campuses faced opposition from students opposed to apartheid.

In the United States, recent examples include the March 2017 disruption by protestors of a public speech at Middlebury College by political scientist Charles Murray. In February 2018, students at the University of Central Oklahoma rescinded a speaking invitation to creationist Ken Ham, after pressure from an LGBT student group. In March 2018, a "small group of protesters" at Lewis & Clark Law School attempted to stop a speech by visiting lecturer Christina Hoff Sommers. In the 2019 film No Safe Spaces, Adam Carolla and Dennis Prager documented their own disinvitation along with others.

As of February 2020, the Foundation for Individual Rights in Education, a speech advocacy group, documented 469 disinvitation or disruption attempts at American campuses since 2000, including both "unsuccessful disinvitation attempts" and "successful disinvitations"; the group defines the latter category as including three subcategories: formal disinvitation by the sponsor of the speaking engagement; the speaker's withdrawal "in the face of disinvitation demands"; and "heckler's vetoes" (situations when "students or faculty persistently disrupt or entirely prevent the speakers' ability to speak").

=== Deplatforming in social media ===
Beginning in 2015, Reddit banned several communities on the site ("subreddits") for violating the site's anti-harassment policy. A 2017 study published in the journal Proceedings of the ACM on Human-Computer Interaction, examining "the causal effects of the ban on both participating users and affected communities", found that "the ban served a number of useful purposes for Reddit" and that "Users participating in the banned subreddits either left the site or (for those who remained) dramatically reduced their hate speech usage. Communities that inherited the displaced activity of these users did not suffer from an increase in hate speech". In June 2020 and January 2021, Reddit also issued bans to pro-Trump communities over violations of the website's content and harassment policies.

On May 2, 2019, Facebook and the Facebook-owned platform Instagram announced a ban of "dangerous individuals and organizations" including Nation of Islam leader Louis Farrakhan, Milo Yiannopoulos, Alex Jones and his organization InfoWars, Paul Joseph Watson, Laura Loomer, and Paul Nehlen. In the wake of the 2021 storming of the US Capitol, Twitter banned then-president Donald Trump, as well as 70,000 other accounts linked to the event and the far-right movement QAnon.

Some studies have found that the deplatforming of extremists reduced their audience, although other research has found that some content creators became more toxic following deplatforming and migration to alt-tech platform.

==== Twitter ====
On November 18, 2022, Elon Musk, as newly appointed CEO of Twitter, reopened previously banned Twitter accounts of high-profile users, including Kathy Griffin, Jordan Peterson, and The Babylon Bee as part of the new Twitter policy. As Musk exclaimed, "New Twitter policy is freedom of speech, but not freedom of reach".

==== Alex Jones ====
On August 6, 2018, Facebook, Apple, YouTube and Spotify removed all content by Jones and InfoWars for policy violations. YouTube removed channels associated with InfoWars, including The Alex Jones Channel. On Facebook, four pages associated with InfoWars and Alex Jones were removed over repeated policy violations. Apple removed all podcasts associated with Jones from iTunes. On August 13, 2018, Vimeo removed all of Jones's videos because of "prohibitions on discriminatory and hateful content". Facebook cited instances of dehumanizing immigrants, Muslims and transgender people, as well as glorification of violence, as examples of hate speech. After InfoWars was banned from Facebook, Jones used another of his websites, NewsWars, to circumvent the ban.

Jones's accounts were also removed from Pinterest, Mailchimp and LinkedIn. As of early August 2018, Jones retained active accounts on Instagram, Google+ and Twitter.

In September, Jones was permanently banned from Twitter and Periscope after berating CNN reporter Oliver Darcy. On September 7, 2018, the InfoWars app was removed from Apple's App Store for "objectionable content". He was banned from using PayPal for business transactions, having violated the company's policies against "hate or discriminatory intolerance against certain communities and religions". After Elon Musk's purchase of Twitter, several previously banned accounts were reinstated—including those of Donald Trump, Andrew Tate and Kanye West—resulting in users wondering whether Alex Jones would be unbanned as well, which was denied by Musk, who criticized Jones as the kind of person that "would use the deaths of children for gain, politics or fame".

InfoWars remained available on Roku devices in January 2019, a year after the channel's removal from multiple streaming services. Roku indicated that they do not "curate or censor based on viewpoint", and that it had policies against content that is "unlawful, incited illegal activities, or violates third-party rights", but that InfoWars was not in violation of these policies. Following a social media backlash, Roku removed InfoWars and stated "After the InfoWars channel became available, we heard from concerned parties and have determined that the channel should be removed from our platform".

In March 2019, YouTube terminated the Resistance News channel due to its reuploading of live streams from InfoWars. On May 1, 2019, Jones was barred from using both Facebook and Instagram. Jones briefly moved to Dlive, but was suspended in April 2019 for violating community guidelines.

In March 2020, the InfoWars app was removed from the Google Play Store due to claims of Jones disseminating COVID-19 misinformation. A Google spokesperson stated that "combating misinformation on the Play Store is a top priority for the team" and apps that violate Play policy by "distributing misleading or harmful information" are removed from the store.

==== Donald Trump ====
On January 6, 2021, in a joint session of the United States Congress, the counting of the votes of the Electoral College was interrupted by a breach of the United States Capitol chambers. The rioters were supporters of President Donald Trump who hoped to delay and overturn the President's loss in the 2020 election. The event resulted in five deaths and at least 400 people being charged with crimes. The certification of the electoral votes was only completed in the early morning hours of January 7, 2021. In the wake of several Tweets by President Trump on January 7, 2021, Facebook, Instagram, YouTube, Reddit and Twitter deplatformed Trump to some extent. Twitter deactivated his personal account, which the company said could possibly be used to promote further violence. Trump subsequently tweeted similar messages from the President's official US Government account @POTUS, which resulted in him being permanently banned on January 8. Twitter then announced that Trump's ban from their platform would be permanent.

Trump planned to rejoin on social media through the use of a new platform by May or June 2021, according to Jason Miller on a Fox News broadcast.

The same week Musk announced Twitter's new freedom of speech policy, he tweeted a poll to ask whether to bring back Trump into the platform. The poll ended with 51.8% in favor of unbanning Trump's account. Twitter has since reinstated Trump's Twitter account @realDonaldTrump (as of 19 Nov 2022, though, by then, Trump's platform of choice was already Truth Social).

==== Andrew Tate ====
In 2017, Andrew Tate was deplatformed from Twitter, for tweeting in response to the #MeToo movement that women should bear some responsibility for what happened to them. Similarly, in August 2022, Tate was banned from four more major social media platforms: Instagram, Facebook, TikTok and YouTube, all of which indicated that Tate's misogynistic comments violated their hatespeech policies. Tate has since been unbanned from Twitter as part of its new freedom of speech policy.

==== Demonetization ====
Social media platforms such as YouTube and Instagram allow their content producers or influencers to earn money based on the content (videos, images, etc.), most typically based around some sort of payment per a set number of new "likes" or clicks, among other metrics. When the content is deemed inappropriate for compensation, but still left on the platform, this is called "demonetization" because the content producer is left with no compensation for their content that they created, while at the same time the content is still left up and available for viewing or listening by the general public. In September 2016, Vox reported that demonetization—as it pertained to YouTube specifically—involved the following key points:

1. Since 2012, YouTube has been automatically demonetizing some videos which were deemed by its proprietary algorithms to be advertiser-unfriendly.
2. Many creators never realized that for years on end, until finally (in 2016) YouTube told them about such changes.
3. Even though said changes have greatly upset many YouTubers, YouTube is still acting as expected for a business: trying to connect other businesses to potential customers via non-harmful content. "It's not censorship", according to Vox, because YouTube videomakers "can still post (just about) anything they want".
4. Regardless, YouTube's demonetization software still had a high rate of false positives, meaning some videos that normally should have their advertisements enabled had lost them and the revenue they bring.

=== Other examples ===
Deplatforming tactics have also included attempts to silence controversial speakers through various forms of personal harassment, such as doxing, the making of false emergency reports for purposes of swatting, and complaints or petitions to third parties. In some cases, protesters have attempted to have speakers blacklisted from projects or fired from their jobs.

In 2019, students at the University of the Arts in Philadelphia circulated an online petition demanding that Camille Paglia be removed from the faculty and replaced by a queer person of color. According to The Atlantic's Conor Friedersdorf, "It is rare for student activists to argue that a tenured faculty member at their own institution should be denied a platform". Paglia, a 30-year-tenured professor who identifies as transgender, had "long been unapologetically outspoken on controversial matters of sex, gender identity, and sexual assault".

In December 2017, after learning that a French artist it had previously reviewed was a neo-Nazi, the San Francisco punk magazine Maximum Rocknroll apologized and announced that it has a strict no-platform policy towards any bands and artists with a Nazi ideology.

== Legislative responses ==
=== United Kingdom ===
In May 2021, the UK government under Boris Johnson announced a Higher Education (Freedom of Speech) Bill that would allow speakers at universities to seek compensation for no-platforming, impose fines on universities and student unions that promote the practice, and establish a new ombudsman charged with monitoring cases of no-platforming and academic dismissals. In addition, the government published an Online Safety Bill that would prohibit social media networks from discriminating against particular political views or removing "democratically important" content, such as comments opposing or supporting political parties and policies.

=== United States ===
Some critics of deplatforming have proposed that governments should treat social media as a public utility to ensure that constitutional rights of the users are protected, citing their belief that an Internet presence using social media websites is imperative in order to adequately take part in the 21st century as an individual. Republican politicians have sought to weaken the protections established by Section 230 of the Communications Decency Act—which provides immunity from liability for providers and users of an "interactive computer service" who publish information provided by third-party users—under allegations that the moderation policies of major social networks are not politically neutral.

== Reactions ==
=== Support for deplatforming ===
According to its defenders, deplatforming has been used as a tactic to prevent the spread of hate speech and disinformation. Social media has evolved into a significant source of news reporting for its users, and support for content moderation and banning of inflammatory posters has been defended as an editorial responsibility required by news outlets.

Supporters of deplatforming have justified the action on the grounds that it produces the desired effect of reducing what they characterize as hate speech. Angelo Carusone, president of the progressive organization Media Matters for America and who had run deplatforming campaigns against conservative talk hosts Rush Limbaugh in 2012 and Glenn Beck in 2010, pointed to Twitter's 2016 ban of Milo Yiannopoulos, stating that "the result was that he lost a lot.... He lost his ability to be influential or at least to project a veneer of influence".

In the United States, the argument that deplatforming violates rights protected by the First Amendment is sometimes raised as a criticism. Proponents say that deplatforming is a legal way of dealing with controversial users online or in other digital spaces, so long as the government is not involved with causing the deplatforming. According to Audie Cornish, host of the NPR show Consider This, the government can't "silence your ability to say almost anything you want on a public street corner", but a private company can "silence your ability to say whatever you want on a platform they created".

=== Critical responses ===
In the words of technology journalist Declan McCullagh, "Silicon Valley's efforts to pull the plug on dissenting opinions" began around 2018 when Twitter, Facebook and YouTube denied service to selected users of their platforms. He said that they devised "excuses to suspend ideologically disfavored accounts". In 2019, McCullagh predicted that paying customers would become targets for deplatforming as well, citing protests and open letters by employees of Amazon, Microsoft, Salesforce and Google, who opposed Immigration and Customs Enforcement (ICE) policies and reportedly sought to influence their employers to deplatform the agency and its contractors.

Law professor Glenn Reynolds dubbed 2018 the "Year of Deplatforming" in an August 2018 article published by The Wall Street Journal. Reynolds criticized the decision of "internet giants" to "slam the gates on a number of people and ideas they don't like", naming Alex Jones and Gavin McInnes. Reynolds cited further restrictions on "even mainstream conservative figures" such as Dennis Prager, as well as Facebook's blocking of a campaign advertisement by Elizabeth Heng, a California Republican congressional candidate, "ostensibly because her video mentioned the Cambodian genocide, which her family survived".

In a 2019 The Atlantic article, Conor Friedersdorf described what he called "standard practice" among student activists: "Activists begin with social-media callouts; they urge authority figures to impose outcomes that they favor, without regard for overall student opinion; they try to marshal antidiscrimination law to limit freedom of expression." Friedersdorf pointed to evidence of a chilling effect on free speech and academic freedom: of the faculty members whom he had contacted for interviews, "a large majority on both sides of the controversy insisted that their comments be kept off the record or anonymous", citing a fear of "openly participating in a debate about a major event at their institution", even after their university president put out an uncompromising statement in support of free speech.

A 2025 historical analysis by Reason of several decades of various kinds deplatforming concluded, "Deplatforming doesn't work", as the targeted speakers or ideas typically returned in worse forms and gained audiences.

== See also ==
- Boycott
- No Platform
- Freedom of speech
- Censorship
- Online shaming
- Social media as a public utility
- Cancel culture
- Marsh v. Alabama
