= BitChute =

Video hosting service

- Website type: Online video platform
- Available in: English
- Headquarters: Sheridan, Wyoming, U.S.
- Country of origin: United Kingdom
- Creator: Ray Vahey
- Parent: BitChute Inc.
- Website: bitchute.com
- Registration: Optional
- Launched: January 2017; 9 years ago
- Current status: Active

BitChute is an alt-tech video hosting service launched by Ray Vahey in January 2017. Originally established in the United Kingdom, it suspended its services there in 2025 and relocated to the United States. It describes itself as offering freedom of speech, and is known for hosting far-right individuals, conspiracy theorists, and hate speech. (Note: Known for accommodating far-right individuals and conspiracy theorists) (Note: Known for hosting hateful material) Some creators who use BitChute have been banned from YouTube; some others crosspost content to both platforms or post more extreme content only to BitChute. Before its deprecation, BitChute claimed to use peer-to-peer WebTorrent technology for video distribution, though this was disputed.

== History ==
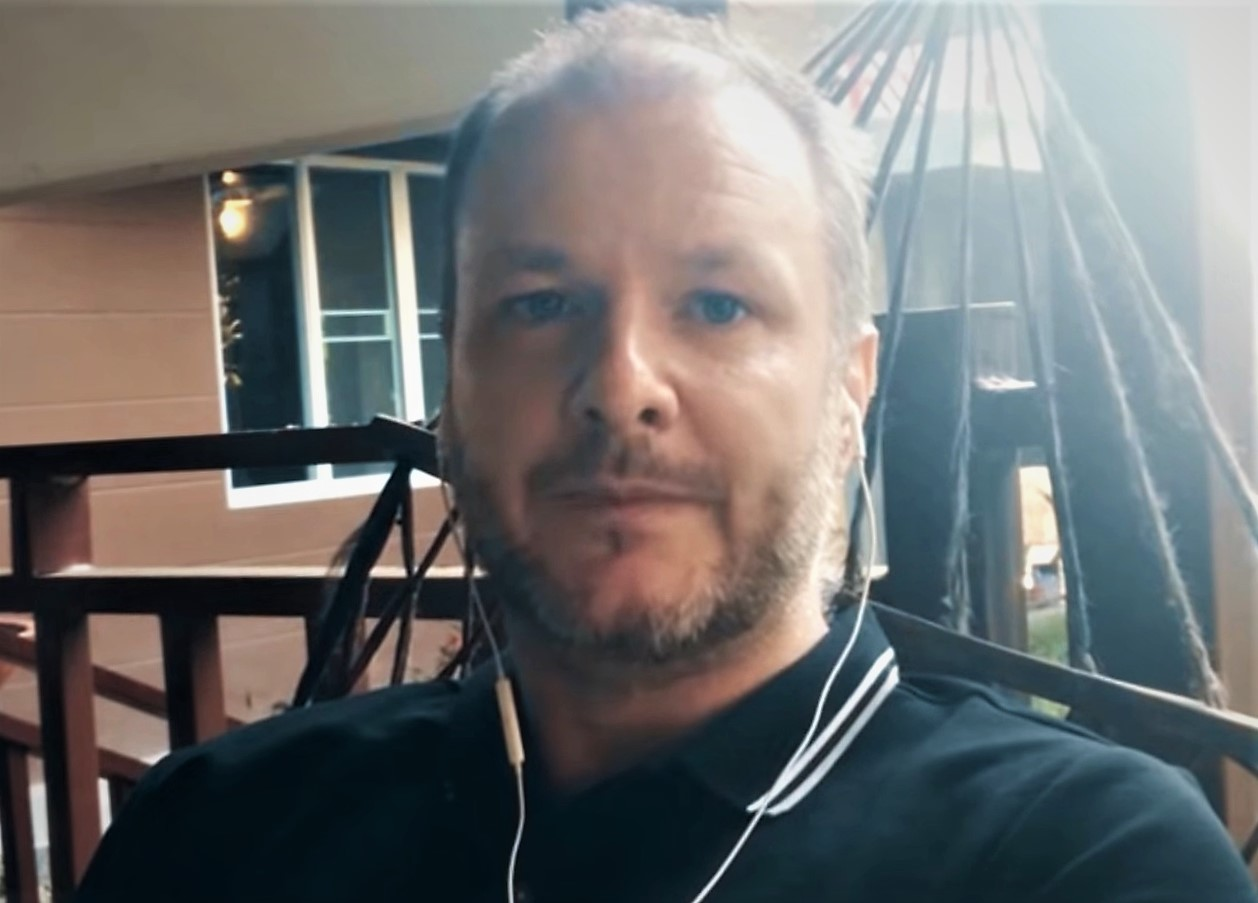
Ray Vahey in 2018

Bit Chute Limited, BitChute's corporate identity, was registered by Ray Vahey in January 2017 in Newbury, England. Its name was conceived from a portmanteau of the words "bit", a unit of information in computing, and "parachute." At the time of the site's launch, Vahey described BitChute as an alternative to mainstream platforms; he believed these platforms had demonstrated "increased levels of censorship" over the previous few years by banning and demonetising users (barring them from receiving advertising revenue), and "tweaking algorithms to send certain content into obscurity". In 2018, the creators of BitChute described themselves as a "small team making a stand against Internet censorship because we believe it is the right thing to do."

In November 2018, BitChute was banned from PayPal. PayPal also banned Alex Jones, the Proud Boys, Tommy Robinson, and several anti-fascist groups and users at the same time. In 2019, crowdfunding website IndieGogo also banned BitChute. BitChute has also been banned from using Patreon and Stripe.

In January 2019, BitChute announced in a post on Gab that they would move their domains over to Epik, a small domain registrar known for accepting the registration of websites that host far-right content.

In March 2020, a new provision to Germany's Network Enforcement Act required social media companies to report instances of hate speech on their platforms to authorities. However, online news platform Coda reported that while the law applies to platforms including YouTube, Facebook, and Twitter, BitChute is one of the platforms not affected by the provision. In early August 2020, Twitter began blocking posts linking to the site, later showing a warning to users who clicked on the links. In 2020, BitChute joined the UN's "Tech Against Terrorism" partnership.

As of January 2021, BitChute was in the process of being reported to Ofcom by the Community Security Trust after discovering Holocaust denial and Holocaust glorification content on the website, among other content considered harmful by the charity such as conspiracy theories related to COVID-19. The trust's blog stated this will be an important test case for Ofcom's new role regarding regulation of social media in the United Kingdom, especially concerning extremism and hateful content. Also in January, BitChute added "incitement to hatred" to its list of prohibited content, using the definition from the United Kingdom's Audiovisual Media Services Regulations 2020, though Bellingcat wrote the following month that "racist slurs, Nazi imagery and calls for violence against Jews remained common in video comment sections."

In June 2023, Police Scotland launched an investigation into content published on BitChute that directed abuse and threats towards First Minister Humza Yousaf after receiving a complaint from his office. The content included several Red Ice videos featuring American white supremacist Lana Lokteff, one of which called for Yousaf to "go back" to Pakistan.

As of July 2023, the site reported having had 218 million unique visitors the past year.

In April 2025, BitChute suspended access to its video-sharing service for users located in the United Kingdom. Visitors from UK IP addresses are presented with a notice stating that the service is unavailable in the country due to regulatory conditions, specifically referencing the Online Safety Act 2023. Following the withdrawal from the UK market, the company relocated its operational base to the United States, establishing a corporate entity headquartered in Sheridan, Wyoming.

== Content ==
Since launching, BitChute has accommodated far-right groups and individuals. The Southern Poverty Law Center wrote in 2019 that the site hosts "hate-fueled material", the Anti-Defamation League wrote in 2020 that "BitChute has become a hotbed for violent, conspiratorial and hate-filled video propaganda, and a recruiting ground for extremists", and Bellingcat wrote in 2021 that the platform was "rife with racism and hate speech". According to a 2020 report from anti-extremism group Hope not Hate, BitChute "actively promotes" content which was removed from other platforms as hate speech. Hope not Hate also documented videos hosted on BitChute supporting or produced by terrorist groups, including ISIS and the neo-Nazi groups National Action and Atomwaffen Division. A June 2020 report from British Jewish group Community Security Trust said that some terrorist videos had been on the site for over a year, and that BitChute only removes this content when forced to. An academic analysis published in July 2020, using a dataset collected over five months in 2019, found that BitChute had more hate speech than Gab, but less than 4chan. It found that only a small group of channels on the network had any meaningful engagement, and almost all of them were pushing conspiracy- and hate-laden content. Similar to Hope not Hate's research, this analysis found content promoting the Atomwaffen Division posted on BitChute, including a recruitment video. The neo-Nazi propaganda film Europa: The Last Battle has been uploaded to multiple BitChute channels. In 2020, Bitchute eventually banned various extremist groups from the platform and published its first official transparency report.

BitChute's founder Ray Vahey has described BitChute as "politically neutral". Hope Not Hate wrote in their 2020 report that "in actuality, the company chooses to almost exclusively promote content and producers that engage in hate speech and harmful misinformation" and that the "vile and dangerous content that abounds on BitChute is a result of deliberate decisions on the part of their founder and team". Bellingcat reported in 2021 that Vahey used the platform's Twitter account to promote antisemitic conspiracy theories, COVID-19 misinformation, and QAnon content.

BitChute is part of a group of "alt-tech" websites that position themselves as less strictly-moderated alternatives to mainstream social media platforms like YouTube, Facebook, and Twitter. Deen Freelon and colleagues writing in Science characterised BitChute as among the alt-tech sites that are "dedicated to right-wing communities", and listed the site along with 4chan, 8chan, Parler, and Gab. They noted there are also more ideologically neutral alt-tech platforms, such as Discord and Telegram. Joe Mulhall of the UK anti-racism group Hope Not Hate has categorised BitChute among the "bespoke platforms" for the far-right, which he defines as platforms which were created by people who themselves have "far-right leanings". He distinguishes these from "co-opted platforms" such as DLive and Telegram, which were adopted by the far-right due to minimal moderation but not specifically created for their use.

Some creators who have been banned from YouTube or had their channels demonetised subsequently migrated to BitChute. The far-right conspiracy theory channel InfoWars migrated to BitChute after being banned by YouTube in 2018. Other creators maintain a presence on YouTube and on BitChute, and some post more extreme content on BitChute while using YouTube for less extreme material. Prominent far-right and alt-right video creators who have cross-posted to both YouTube and BitChute include Lauren Southern, Stefan Molyneux, Millennial Woes, and Paul Joseph Watson.

The platform also hosts misinformation related to the COVID-19 pandemic. The conspiracy theory video Plandemic has been viewed on BitChute millions of times after having been removed from other platforms for spreading medically harmful misinformation.

== Model ==
BitChute gets revenue from advertising as well as paid site memberships and donations. The platform also includes features allowing users to send donations to video creators directly. Since its launch, the site has promoted its use of the peer-to-peer technology WebTorrent as a means to decentralise hosting and reduce costs. BitChute allows creators to monetise the videos they publish on the platform by linking to fundraising websites including SubscribeStar, PayPal, and cryptocurrency processors. Although PayPal banned BitChute themselves from using their service, BitChute still links to PayPal pages for creators who choose to use them.

At launch, the site claimed it was using peer-to-peer WebTorrent technology. However, a November 2019 report by Fredrick Brennan, published in The Daily Dot, failed to find any evidence of peer-to-peer data transfer in BitChute's videos. All videos Brennan downloaded came directly from BitChute's servers, with no part of the videos received from peers. According to Brennan, magnet links on the site do not work. Brennan challenged BitChute's use of the word "delist" to describe deplatforming users, saying that the wording is misleading in that it makes BitChute seem falsely similar to BitTorrent (where a site maintains one "list" of content, but independent trackers may be created as well), when in reality BitChute is just deleting a user's videos from the BitChute site. According to Ars Technica in April 2021, the option to host videos using WebTorrent on BitChute "appears to have been deprecated".

== See also ==
- Alt-tech
- Comparison of video hosting services
- List of online video platforms
- PeerTube
- Rumble
