= DataGueule =

- Created by: Julien Goetz
- Country of origin: France
- Original language: French
- No. of seasons: 6
- No. of episodes: 90

Production
- Running time: 4-12 min

Original release
- Network: France 4
- Release: 6 June 2014

DataGueule (or #Datagueule) is a TV show and a web series with a variable publication (one or two episodes per month) broadcast since June 2014 on France 4 as well as on YouTube, Dailymotion and PeerTube.

The programme offers animated videos concerning news on a fun way, and condensed with a didactic aim. Each episode try to reveal and figure out the mechanisms of society and their unknown aspects.

The DataGueule's team is made up of Henri Poulain (creator and producer), Julien Goetz (co-author and co-creator) and of Sylvain Lapoix (investigator and co-author).

== Description ==
=== Composition of the episodes ===
Until the fourth season, the episodes were short, on average between 3 and 5 minutes, condensing the numerals, realities and future ideas quickly.

During the fifth season, the episodes are dividing in three parts : the first explaining the situation and setting numerals out quickly in few minutes, before a phase of interview of a specialist in this subject, who explains more in detail the problem and the possibilities, that are picked again in the last part. The images and texts are arranged in mosaic, depicting an image in the fourth first seasons, and an emblematic statue of our society in the fifth.

=== Authors ===
Julien Goetz works at the beginning of the 2000s for the very one multimedia editorial board of Radio France as a freelance web developer during six or seven years. Then, he joins the OWNI company (acronym of "Objet web non identifié", in English : "Unidentified Web object") during two years to make data journalism in 2011.

In 2011, he takes part in other projects like Nuit sujet (in English : "Night subject") with Radio Nova where debates are approached. From September 2012 to June 2013, he is co-author in C Politique on France 5. In May and June 2014, he contacts France 4 for the creation of the DataGueule's channel. He is also actor from time to time and is often employed to make voice-over.

He co-writes with Jean-Marc Manach a report for Arte, titled Une contre-histoire de l'Internet (in English : "a counter-history of the Internet"). From November 2013 to March 2014, he works with Premières Lignes Télévision and Journalism++ on Jeu d'influence (in English : "Influence game"), a concept mixing game and documentary talking about the crisis' questions. In 2015, he works to the writing of a documentary of 90 min.

It is on June 6, 2014, that the channel DataGueule appear for the first time on the Web, with a video about Ukraine. Their research work begins on May 6, 2014. The principle of this programme is to "deconstruct several mechanisms, with humor and if possible an historical prism (...) subjects about which we realize that it doesn't run smoothly. Even if we must dissect them to understand exactly what doesn't run smoothly".

This programme isn't the one who create the genre, an Australian first concept existed yet, named Hungry Beast, but owing to numerals and data used as well as the informal tone that France 4 allows, the tone of the DataGueule team's videos appears more striking, quicklier and more scathing. "What is my first interest in datas, it's the assessment that it enable to make. The basic premise it's : how had we come to this situation, until the normalization of these facts without researching if it is good or bad. We're always having an informal tone. And we're trying no to go into clichés, given that it's a short programme".

=== Subjects ===
The subjects are defined by the team of Julien Goetz. "It is not France 4 which impose the thematics", declare him in an interview.

== Broadcasting ==
Several parts of DataGueule are broadcast in L'Autre JT on France 4, but mainly on the Web via YouTube, Dailymotion and PeerTube for the broadcasting, and also on other means of communication. Since June 23, 2015, the channel is also broadcast on the IRL platform of FranceTV : IRL, les nouvelles écritures du réel (in English : "IRL, the new writings of the real"). The programme was very briefly broadcast on the TV channel France Info at the air opening of this latter, in September 2016. It is not anymore the case today. Since December 2018, the programme is also broadcast on the Imago TV's programme.

=== Seasons ===
At the beginning, the programme had signed a contract of ten episodes, then, given the growing success of the channel, fifteen other episodes were added to the contract for a total of twenty-five episodes at least. In June 2020, the programme reaches five seasons and 97 episodes.

=== Audience ===
The programme meets with success since the first broadcasts, which provokes the surprise of Julien Goetz. Several episodes had reached with ease 100 000 views and others, like the video about the sleep, had exceeded the 1 100 000 views in 2020. In May 2020, the YouTube channel of the programme has more than 540 000 followers and more than 40 millions of views by cumulative audience.
