= Mobilizon =

Open source event planning software

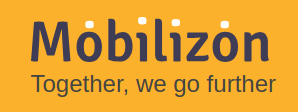
- Mobilizon banner
- Stable release: 5.1.0 / 7 December 2024
- Written in: Elixir, Vue.js
- Available in: English, French
- Type: Event Planning
- License: AGPL v3+
- Website: mobilizon.org
- Repository: framagit.org/kaihuri/mobilizon/

Mobilizon is an open source software for event planning and group management, launched in October 2020 by Framasoft to offer a free alternative to the platforms of GAFAM (Facebook, Meetup.com, EventBrite). Mobilizon gained much visibility in hacker circles relatively fast, and then spread to the wider cultural scene in Europe and more recently in the mainstream IT media.

== How it works ==
The features offered by Mobilizon at the time of the beta launch in October 2019 were:

- creation of accounts through an email and a password
- notifications by email
- creating and managing multiple identities with the same account
- creating, modifying or deleting events
  - from the identity you used to create the event
  - with the possibility to create, keep, modify (and delete) events in draft mode
  - with the possibility to manually validate (or refuse) participation requests
  - that you can easily share on your networks or by email
  - that you can add to your calendar
- registering an event by choosing one of your identities;
- reporting problematic content to the moderator of the Mobilizon instance
- managing reports of problematic content as a moderator

Some instances aim at specific cultural and social impact with the support for multi-lingual communities like the Swiss instance supporting German, French, English, Swiss High German, and Italian language.

== History ==
On May 14, 2019, the Framasoft association launched a crowdfunding campaign in order, on the one hand, to verify the interest of the community for the project, and on the other hand to ensure the financing itself. At the end of the campaign, on July 10, 2019, the participation goal was reached with more than €58,000 collected.

A test platform was put online on October 15, 2019, to allow people supporting the project to discover the tool and get first impressions from the general public.

The first version is scheduled for the first half of 2020.

On June 22, 2020, when Beta3 is released, Version 1 is pushed back to Fall 2020.

On October 27, 2020, the first version is officially launched.

In 2024, the maintenance of Mobilizon is handed over by Framasoft to another french non-profit, Kaihuri, which has received financial support from NLnet foundation to continue the project.

As of February 7, 2025, there are 79 Mobilizon instances located worldwide, with cumulatively 4,188 groups that created 376,753 events.

== Technologies ==
The software is written in the Elixir programming language with Phoenix, a lightweight framework leveraging Elixir.

The user interface is built with the VueJS framework.

Mobilizon is not a giant platform, but a multitude of interconnected Mobilizon websites, called instances, able to communicate with each other using the ActivityPub protocol. This also allows Mobilizon to interact with other software composing the fediverse such as Mastodon and Pleroma.

== See also ==
- Mastodon – microblog using ActivityPub
- PeerTube – Video broadcasting using ActivityPub
- Pixelfed – Image broadcasting
- Framasoft – Association of popular education in digital issues and promotion of free software and culture
- Fediverse – Federation of decentralized services to which Mobilizon belongs
