= NLnet Foundation =

Internet public benefit organization

- Type: Nonprofit organization
- Legal status: Stichting
- Purpose: Free Software Network Research and Development in the Domain of Internet technology
- Headquarters: Amsterdam Science Park
- Region served: Worldwide
- Website: nlnet.nl

The NLnet Foundation supports organizations and people that contribute to an open information society. It was influential in spreading the Internet throughout Europe in the 1980s. In 1997, the foundation sold off its commercial networking operations to UUNET (now part of Verizon), resulting in an endowment with which it makes grants.

NLnet is known for sponsoring open source software and standards work as well as auxiliary activities. Some of the projects that NLnet supports or has supported are Mastodon, Peertube, Galene, Wireguard, DNSSEC, the ODF plugfest, the GPL V3 license drafting process, Tor anonymity network, Namecoin, Jitsi, nftables and Mobilizon.

== History ==
NLnet's history started in April 1982 with the announcement by Teus Hagen as chairman of a major initiative by the European Unix Users Group (EUUG) to develop and provide network services in Europe under the name EUnet. NLnet was the main node of the EUnet operating out of the Netherlands national center for mathematics and computer science CWI, and played a vital role in spreading first UUCP and later the ARPAnet throughout Europe, earning Hagen and other pioneers a place in the Internet Hall of Fame. NLnet also pioneered the world's first dial-in and ISDN infrastructure with full country coverage by using the signal wiring from the Netherlands rail system owned by Nederlandse Spoorwegen. NLnet was one of the founders of the AMS-ix foundation and the .nl registry SIDN.

Stichting NLnet was formally established as a Stichting (Dutch for foundation) in February 1989. In November 1994 Stichting NLnet created NLnet BV (a Dutch Limited liability corporation or BV) as a commercial operating subsidiary and so incorporated the first Internet service provider in The Netherlands. In 1997 the Internet provision services company was acquired by UUnet, which had just become a subsidiary of MFS. MFS was acquired shortly thereafter by Worldcom, which then initiated a takeover bid on MCI and later became a subsidiary of Verizon.

The acquisition provided Stichting NLnet with an endowment to transform into a grant-making organization, funding the development of Internet network technology and associated Computer Sciences research and development. The foundation is a recognized public benefit organization (in Dutch ANBI) and runs an open call where anyone in the world can submit proposals to improve the Internet, as well as several thematic funds such as the Internet Hardening Fund. An overview of current and past NLNET-funded projects can be found on the NLnet website. Results are made freely available to the community in the broadest sense, typically under FOSS licenses and through Internet standards, web standards and the like.

In 1999, NLNet founded NLnet Labs, a network research laboratory in Amsterdam. NLNet Labs develops DNS-related software, such as NSD, Unbound, OpenDNSSEC, getDNS as well as BGP related tooling such as Rotonda and Krill.
