= J++ =

J++ may refer to:

- Visual J++, Microsoft's discontinued implementation of the Java programming language.
- Journalism++, a European datajournalism network.
