= Caolan Robertson =

Irish journalist and influencer

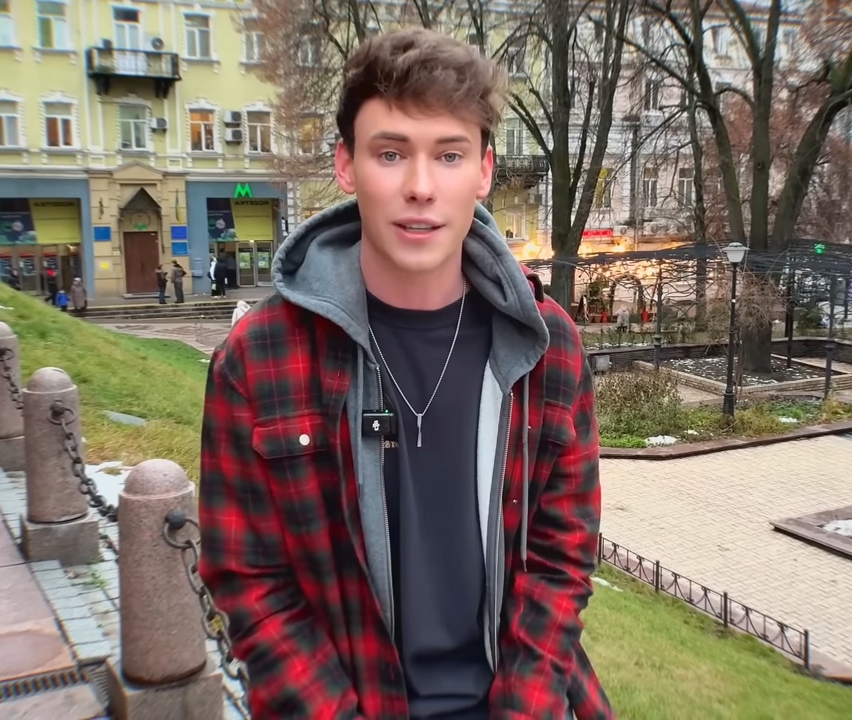
- Robertson in 2025
- Born: Kilkenny, Ireland
- Occupations: Influencer, filmmaker, journalist
- Awards: Order of Merit, 3rd class (2026)

Caolan Robertson (/keɪlən/) is an Irish-born influencer, filmmaker and journalist. He is a co-founder of Future Freedom and former director at BylineTV. He has been reporting from Ukraine since 2022.

On 6 June 2026 Robertson was awarded Ukraine's Order of Merit, 3rd Class by Ukrainian president Volodymyr Zelenskyy.

== Early life ==
Robertson was born in Ireland and is from Kilkenny, but moved to the United Kingdom with his father when he was 13. Robertson says he realised he was gay from a very young age.

== Background in politics ==
Between 2016 and 2019, Robertson worked as a videographer, producer and director for several prominent alt-right figures and outlets, including Tommy Robinson, Lauren Southern, Alex Jones, Stefan Molyneux, Gavin McInnes, and the Canadian far-right website Rebel Media. According to The New York Times, Robertson specialized in filming and editing provocative confrontations, street protests, and anti-immigrant videos engineered to exploit YouTube's recommendation algorithm and maximize outrage-driven engagement.

Robertson devised Rebel Media's "#TrollWatch" series, which involved filming unannounced confrontations at the homes and workplaces of critics, anti-racism campaigners and journalists, often in the early hours of the morning. Robertson later acknowledged that he had selectively edited footage to fabricate narratives for Robinson, including cutting a video filmed in Rome to make Robinson appear threatened when unedited footage showed Robinson shoving a passerby toward oncoming traffic. In 2021 he told The New York Times "We would choose the most dramatic moment - or fake it and make it look more dramatic."

In mid-2018, Robertson worked as the tour producer and spokesperson for far-right activist Lauren Southern and white nationalist blogger Stefan Molyneux, commenting "Hope you enjoy shariah" after a venue in Auckland cancelled the event during their controversial speaking tour of Australia and New Zealand.

According to Robertson, he was involved with far-right politics for "around three years" and was drawn into it in reaction to the anti-gay sentiment he says he encountered among conservative Muslims in London and the targeting of the gay community in the 2016 Pulse nightclub shooting. 49 people were killed in the attack at a gay nightclub in Orlando, Florida. Searching the internet for information about the shooting, Robertson says he found anti-Islamic results from far-right news sources and activists. "As soon as you watch a few of them, you get recommended many, many more and I really started going down an online-specific rabbit hole."

By early 2019, Robertson said he had grown disillusioned with working with the far-right, and in a January 2019 Sky News interview portrayed himself as having abandoned the ideology while arguing that mass migration posed a threat to patriotism and cultural homogeneity. Writing in Vice, journalist Simon Childs disputed that Robertson had genuinely changed, pointing to his ongoing collaborations with right-wing activist Laura Loomer and his work directing Lauren Southern's anti-migration documentary Borderless, and arguing that mainstream outlets were uncritically granting former far-right producers "redemption" narratives without accountability for their earlier output. According to Robertson, the Christchurch mosque shootings by a white supremacist in March were "the final straw". He says he spent 2019 to 2020 recovering from leaving what he described as "a cult", and as of 2021 claimed he was "exposing the far-right, exposing disinformation."

== Documentary topics ==
=== Ukraine ===
By 2021, Robertson was working as a director at BylineTV. During an interview with The Bulwark, Robertson said that when the 2022 Russian invasion of Ukraine began, he visited the country and made a documentary about the war. He says he was so affected by the experience that upon returning to the United Kingdom, he found he "couldn't go back to doing what he had been doing". He returned to Ukraine in mid-2024, where he lives and works full-time. Robertson received an Honorary Ambassador Award for Digital Diplomacy in 2025 from the First Lady of Ukraine, Olena Zelenska.

In February 2025, a Russian court in Kursk ordered Robertson's arrest in absentia on charges of illegally crossing the Russian state border after he entered Ukrainian-occupied Sudzha to film a report. In August 2025, the Russian Ministry of Foreign Affairs permanently barred him from entering Russia as part of retaliatory sanctions against British media figures.

In October 2026, YouTube removed a video from Robertson's channel following a copyright complaint by The Kyiv Independent, whose editor-in-chief Olga Rudenko stated that Robertson had used an animated map produced by the outlet without permission and cropped out its logo; Robertson subsequently apologised, calling the use an editing oversight and stating that he had introduced new post-production attribution checks.

=== Syria ===
In January 2025, Robertson travelled with Audrey MacAlpine to Syria after the fall of president Bashar al-Assad to document the use of chemical weapons.

=== Davos 2026 ===
In January 2026, Robertson travelled to Davos for the 56th World Economic Forum, where he presented a screening of "Farmers of Kherson" to Ukraine House Davos.

=== Hungary 2026 ===
In April 2026, Robertson travelled to Hungary to report on the 2026 parliamentary elections, covering topics that included the election campaign atmosphere, Hungary–Russia relations, corruption allegations, and assumptions of misuse of European Union funds.

=== Venice Biennale 2026 ===
In May 2026, Robertson confronted Russian ambassador Alexey Paramonov at the Russian pavilion, highlighting the disparity between Russia's "cultural" display and its ongoing attacks on Ukrainian cities and infrastructure.

=== Ireland ===
In June 2026, Robertson questioned Irish politicians over their position on the Aughinish Alumina plant in County Limerick, following an OCCRP investigation finding it supplies alumina to sanctioned entities in Russia.

Commenting on Robertson's coverage, Irish Examiner columnist Colin Sheridan noted a continuity of methods from Robertson's earlier far-right media work, arguing that his "influencer journalism" prioritized emotional outrage and presented his coverage of the plant as an uncovered conspiracy theory, while ignoring extensive prior reporting and public debate. A subsequent profile in The Irish Times noted Robertson's lack of traditional journalistic training and editorial oversight, highlighting his use of performative stunts and observing that his viral videos followed an earlier investigation into the refinery by the paper.

== Filmography ==
Year	Title	Notes
2023	Under Deadly Skies: Ukraine's Eastern Front	Producer
2024	Hunted in Kherson	Director
2025	Shocking Discovery in Syria (with Audrey MacAlpine)	Producer
2024	The Battle for Kyiv	Producer
2025	Farmers of Kherson	Producer

== Notable interviews ==
In June 2025, he had an interview with Fidias Panayiotou.

In March 2026, he interviewed Ukrainian president Volodymyr Zelenskyy.

In July 2026, he interviewed the commander of Ukraine's Unmanned Systems Forces, Robert "Madyar" Brovdi.

In August 2026, he interviewed former Ukrainian defence minister Mykhailo Fedorov, a month after Fedorov's controversial dismissal.
