= WebTorrent =

Peer-to-peer web-based torrent client

- Logo
- Original author: Feross Aboukhadijeh
- Developer: WebTorrent
- Release: 22 October 2013; 12 years ago
- Written in: JavaScript
- Operating system: Cross-platform
- Available in: JavaScript
- Type: Communications protocol, distributed file system, content delivery network
- License: MIT
- Website: WebTorrent.io
- Repository: github.com/webtorrent/webtorrent

WebTorrent is a peer-to-peer (P2P) streaming torrent client written in JavaScript that enables BitTorrent functionality directly within web browsers. Created by Feross Aboukhadijeh, the developer behind YouTube Instant, WebTorrent implements the BitTorrent protocol using WebRTC for peer-to-peer data transfer, allowing users to download and stream torrents without requiring traditional torrent client software.

The project consists of both a browser-based JavaScript library and WebTorrent Desktop, a standalone desktop application built with Electron. WebTorrent Desktop serves as a bridge between the WebTorrent network and traditional BitTorrent networks, enabling interoperability between web-based and conventional torrent clients. The software supports common video file formats and audio file formats for in-browser streaming, making it particularly suitable for media streaming applications.

WebTorrent is open-source software distributed under the MIT License and is actively developed on GitHub. The project has gained significant adoption in the web development community for its ability to bring decentralized file sharing capabilities to web applications without requiring users to install additional software or browser plugins.

== History ==
Before creating WebTorrent, the developers first created PeerCDN, a peer-to-peer content delivery network which was bought by Yahoo! in 2013.

The idea behind WebTorrent is to make a BitTorrent-like protocol that works on the web browser, maintaining as much compatibility with BitTorrent as possible. Any web browser should be able to connect to a peer-to-peer swarm, fetch content, verify that it is correct, and display it to the user – all as much as possible without centralized servers relying on a network entirely of people's browsers. WebTorrent uses the same protocol as BitTorrent but uses a different transport layer. WebTorrent primarily relies on WebRTC connections, while BitTorrent uses TCP connections and UDP datagrams directly.

== WebTorrent Desktop ==
The WebTorrent Desktop bridges the two networks of WebRTC-based WebTorrent and TCP/UDP-based BitTorrent simultaneously. The BitTorrent client Vuze (formerly Azureus) less gracefully but adequately functionally incorporated WebTorrent adding simultaneous network bridging to their software. The developers used Electron that makes desktop apps using JavaScript with access to all the APIs from Chrome and Node.

== Functionality ==
Online video is the core focus as that is where WebTorrent is most useful. It is less suited for smaller files or data sets but is ideal for larger files.

File availability, as with BitTorrents, is dependent on torrent seeding. If only a few users are sharing a file, then an HTTP server that provides webseeding would be the fallback. There is no sharing without webseeding. However, this could have some positive implications. Rather than using a middleman upload site to share a large private file with another person, with WebTorrent you may directly connect without leaving traces somewhere or potentially being archived on some upload site. You simply drag and drop your file to create a magnet link that you can share with your friend. Connections are already encrypted, but you may add extra layers of encryption with keys to send another way. RAM limits may be managed with IndexedDB.

The client prioritizes downloading pieces chronologically, so that the file is able to be streamed uninterrupted even before the download is complete.

== Adoption ==
WebTorrent uses widely supported open web standards like WebRTC and therefore works in any modern browser, including Google Chrome, Firefox, and Opera for Desktop and Android, Microsoft Edge and Safari.

=== Brave ===
Brave web browser bundles WebTorrent into the native executables and integrates WebTorrent into its UI.

=== Torrent Clients ===
Some torrent clients supports seeding to WebTorrent peers, for example BiglyBT (has Android version) and clients based on the libtorrent like QBittorrent, Deluge and LibreTorrent (Android).

=== Websites ===
==== BitChute ====
Launched in 2017, BitChute is a video hosting service that used WebTorrent P2P technology. It claimed in order to ease bandwidth issues of centralized streaming. According to Fredrick Brennan, there is little evidence BitChute actually uses peer-to-peer technology. By April 2021, the option to host videos using WebTorrent on BitChute "appears to have been deprecated", according to Ars Technica.

==== PeerTube ====
PeerTube formerly used WebTorrent but stopped because of maintaining complexity.

== See also ==
- Comparison of BitTorrent clients
- InterPlanetary File System
- List of video hosting services
  - DailyMotion
  - Vidme
  - Vimeo
  - YouTube
- YouTube Instant
