= Fidias Panayiotou =

Cypriot YouTuber and politician (born 2000)

Fidias Panayiotou MEP
- Φειδίας Παναγιώτου
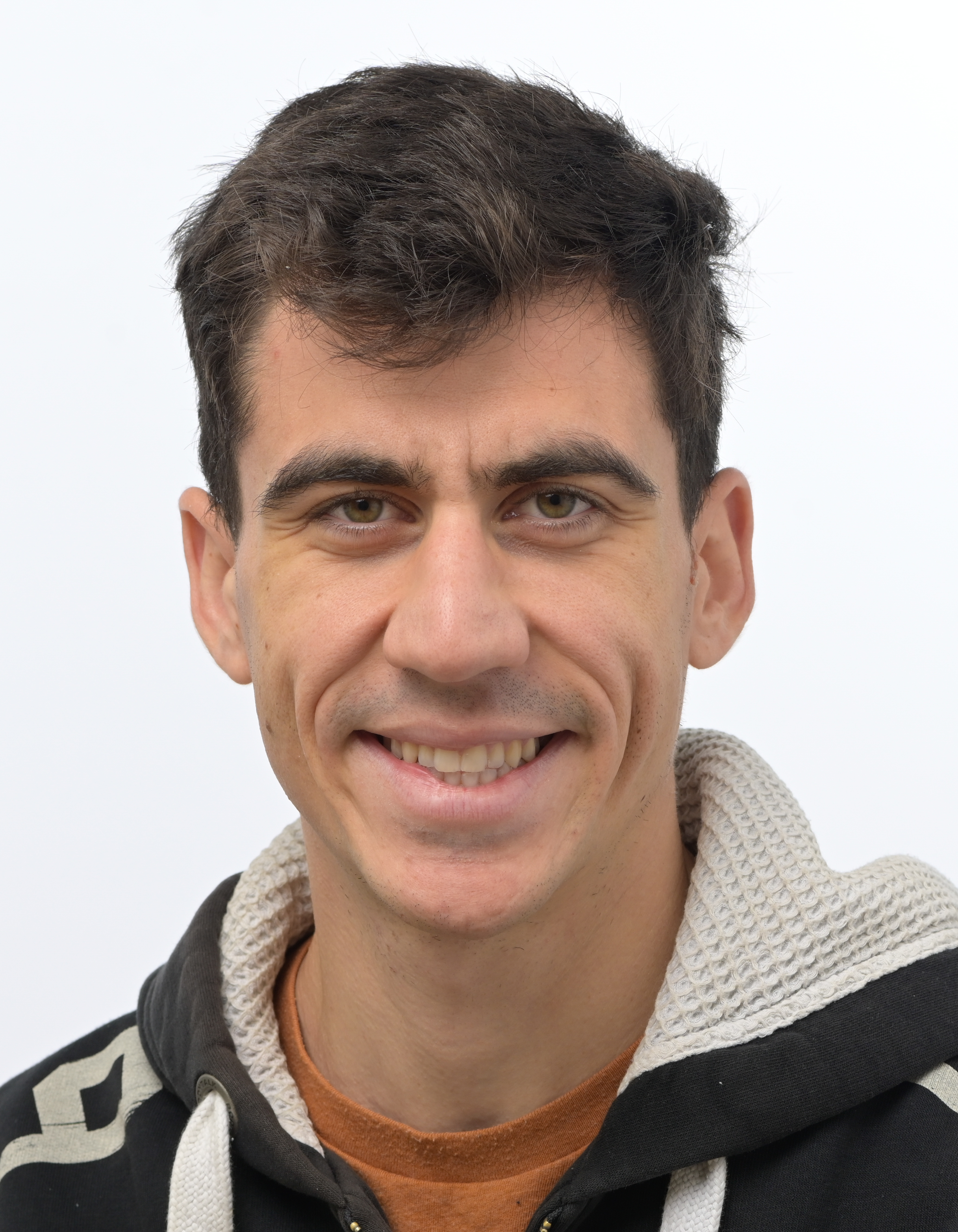
- Official portrait, 2024

President of Direct Democracy Cyprus
- Incumbent
- Assumed office 20 October 2025
- Preceded by: Position established

Member of the European Parliament for Cyprus
- Incumbent
- Assumed office 16 July 2024
- Parliamentary group: Non-Inscrits

Personal details
- Born: 10 April 2000 (age 26) Meniko, Nicosia, Cyprus
- Party: Direct Democracy Cyprus (since 2025)
- Other political affiliations: Independent (2024–2025)

Military service
- Allegiance: Cyprus
- Branch/service: Cyprus Navy
- Unit: Underwater Demolition Team

YouTube information
- Channel: Fidias
- Years active: 2019–present
- Subscribers: 2.65 million
- Views: 674.9 million
- Last updated: 24 July 2026

Fidias Panayiotou MEP (Greek: Φειδίας Παναγιώτου; born 10 April 2000), known mononymously as Fidias, is a Cypriot politician, influencer, social media personality, and YouTuber who has served as a Member of the European Parliament for Cyprus since July 2024. Originally elected as an independent in the 2024 European Parliament election, Panayiotou founded the political party Direct Democracy Cyprus in October 2025.

== Early and personal life ==
Fidias was born in Meniko, in the Nicosia District of Cyprus, to an ethnic Greek family. During his mandatory military service, he served in the Cypriot Underwater Demolition Team. He is married to social media personality Styliana Averkiou.

== YouTube career ==
Fidias began posting videos on YouTube in 2019. On October 8, 2022, Fidias began a mission to hug Elon Musk after having hugged 99 other celebrities for a video. While waiting outside Twitter's headquarters for Musk to appear almost every day, he encouraged his followers to "spam" Elon's mother, Maye Musk, with his request, which she described as "malicious". On January 21, 2023, Musk met and hugged Fidias in the headquarters building.

In January 2023, Fidias announced on Cypriot television his intention to interview every candidate running for the 2023 Cypriot presidential election. He hosted 12 out of the 14 candidates; with Nikos Christodoulides and Andreas Mavroyiannis, the two front-runners, not accepting his invitation.

Through his YouTube channel "Fidias Podcast", he has interviewed various influential personalities, including Nigel Farage, Nas Daily and Andrew Tate. As of January 22, 2025, he had more than 2.7 million subscribers on YouTube.

In September 2023, Fidias uploaded a video of himself freeriding on the Bengaluru Metro in India. The management of the train service responded that they would be filing a criminal case against him.

On October 20, 2023, he continued with a video on travelling across Japan for free with three other YouTubers. He travelled on public transportation modes such as buses and trains while skipping on paying for his fare through various means and begging for cash. He also passed himself off as a guest of a hotel that he was not staying at to help himself to its breakfast. He was criticized for his actions in the video, and made an apology video, which was subsequently deleted. YouTube also removed this video along with four others, including a 2022 video in which he travelled across the United Kingdom for free, for violating its community guidelines.

== Political career ==
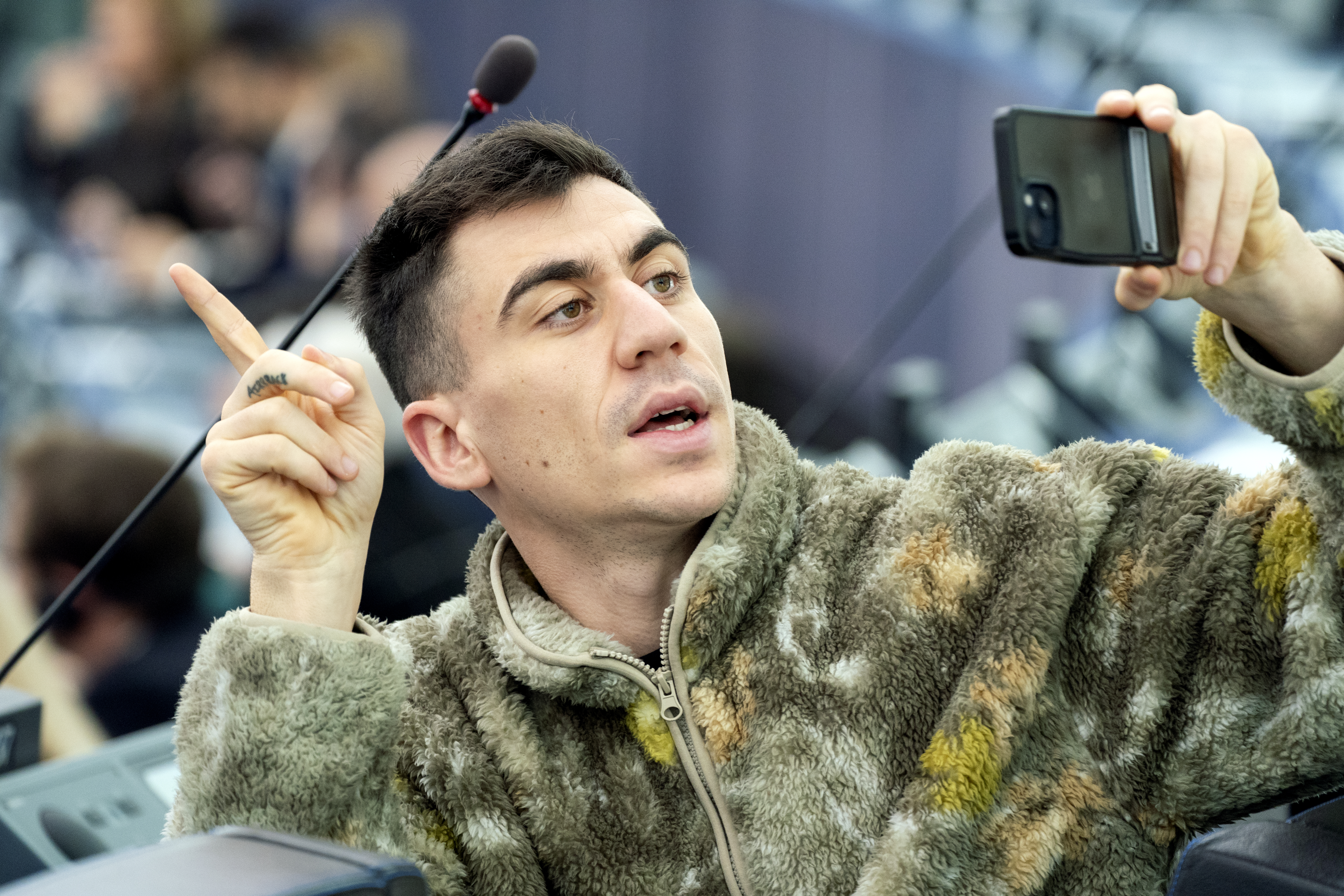
Panayiotou in the European Parliament in Strasbourg, December 2024

In April 2024, Fidias announced his candidacy to the European Parliament, running on an anti-partisan platform and stating his goal to promote youth involvement in politics. As a TikToker with no prior political experience, he was widely regarded as a novelty candidate, attracting significant media attention and energizing younger voters. He emphasised education as his priority, aiming to enhance schools by eliminating exams and promoting self-education. He also acknowledged the significance of artificial intelligence and Bitcoin. Fidias finished third with 19.4% of the popular vote and secured a seat in the European Parliament.

During his first days in office, he let people vote in social media polls for his party affiliation and voting decisions as MEP. On June 9, Panayiotou let people vote in a poll on TikTok if he should join the Greens–European Free Alliance or remain independent. He claims that 10% of the entire population of Cyprus voted in the poll and 76% voted that he would remain independent which he then did. He calls his method a more "direct democracy with the people". In July 2024, he voted against Ursula von der Leyen remaining the president of the European Commission, in accordance with the results of a poll he conducted on his Twitter account. In December of the same year, Fidias announced he was "creating an app for direct democracy", through which European citizens will be able to vote, and have a direct saying on matters discussed in the European parliament.

Fidias was heavily scrutinized by media in both Greece and Cyprus for meeting with Turkish Cypriot influencer Ibrahim Beycanli (known by his online alias "Urban Cypriot") and saying he was only taught "half the history" regarding the Cyprus problem. Their collaboration was made public on 14 August 2024, the 50th anniversary of the second Turkish invasion, a day also marked by Solomos Solomou's killing at the hands of Turkish occupation forces in 1996. Within the Turkish Cypriot community, the video received mixed reactions.

On 13 December 2024, Fidias and Beycanli organized an event featuring Andreas Mavroyiannis and Özdil Nami, former negotiators from both sides of the Cyprus settlement talks, to discuss the past and future of the negotiations. The event was open to the public and it was streamed live on Fidias' social media.

On January 23, 2025, he organized an open discussion with Stefanos Kasselakis, the former leader of the opposition in Greece and current president of the Movement for Democracy, which was streamed live on YouTube.

Since his election, Fidias has been publicly endorsed by Elon Musk on multiple occasions through his posts on Twitter. Notably, in November 2024, Musk posted "Fidias for EU president!!", while in February 2025 he described Fidias as "smart, super high energy" and someone who "genuinely cares about you!". Musk has also seemingly expressed approval of Fidias' views on free speech and the Russian invasion of Ukraine. Due to these interactions, Politico has described Fidias as "Elon Musk's man in the European Parliament". In response, Fidias has denied "being Elon Musk's puppet", claiming that while Musk appreciates his ideas and occasionally comments on his social media posts, they do not have personal or direct communication.

On 8 May 2025, Panayiotou was one of the three MEPs who voted against a motion calling for the return of children abducted by Russia in its invasion of Ukraine, before changing his vote to an abstention. He explained his vote by questioning the sourcing cited in the document. When further questioned about his vote in an interview with journalist Caolan Robertson, Panayiotou claimed that some of the children being brought to Russia from Ukraine are "happy being there". The following day, he traveled to Russia alongside members of the Germany's Sahra Wagenknecht Alliance and Slovakia's Smer party with the stated purpose of promoting dialogue with the country. Fidias has also repeatedly voted against sending aid to Ukraine. The visit drew criticism from many prominent figures, including Cypriot president Nikos Christodoulides.

Fidias is a supporter of Palestine with an anti-Israel voting record in the European Parliament and has said he believes Israel's actions in Gaza are a genocide.

On 26 January 2026, Fidias came under fire for using offensive language to describe Paralympic athletes with mental disabilities by calling them "loonies" during a six-hour podcast with a Cypriot Paralympic swimmer and has since apologized for the use of the slur.

=== Direct Democracy Party ===
On October 20, 2025, Panayiotou announced the formation of a new political party, Direct Democracy Cyprus, via social media. As of October 2025, details about the party's structure are limited, with the only confirmed information being that the party's parliamentary candidates will be elected by the public through a mobile app. This working application named Agorà can be seen by everyone, and in it the Cypriot citizens (by showing their police ID) have the right to vote and indicate to the representative what they want him to vote for or against. In this way, every parliamentary representative can be transformed into a Trojan horse of direct democracy that can survive in a parliamentary environment. The ultimate goal of such representatives is to become the majority in a parliament and one day to transform the political system from parliamentarism to (direct) democracy. This is the third attempt to establish direct democracy into a parliament via a Trojan Horse system, with the first one being IserveU. This idea was also tried, under the name pirategov, in the Pirate Party of Greece until 2013.

== Electoral history ==
2024 European Parliament election
Constituency	Party	Group	Votes	Result	Ref
Cyprus	Independent	NI	71,330	Elected	
