= Red Ice =

White supremacist media company

- Formation: 2002; 24 years ago
- Founded at: Gothenburg, Sweden
- Type: White supremacist
- Official language: English
- Key people: Lana Lokteff and Henrik Palmgren
- Website: redice.tv

Red Ice is a white supremacist multimedia company founded in Sweden and led by the married couple Lana Lokteff and Henrik Palmgren. The Southern Poverty Law Center (SPLC) has described Red Ice as being important in the YouTube alt-right radicalization pipeline, further radicalizing people tentatively on the far-right and having "a history of embracing white supremacist rhetoric and talking points".

== Products and content ==
From 2002 to 2012, the main focus of Red Ice's content was conspiracy theories such as aliens, 9/11, the Illuminati, and Freemasonry. In 2012, the outlet shifted to concentrate on ideas of race, and especially to the idea of the white genocide conspiracy theory in response to what the couple perceived as "anti-white sentiment" coinciding with the Black Lives Matter movement.

As of 2017, Red Ice's main output was its weekly talk-radio-style programs. Interviews make up part of this content; Lokteff searches for personalities on the internet based on viewer recommendations and brings them on the program. Lokteff hosts her own program, Radio 3Fourteen, which highlights white nationalist women and alt-right preferences towards gender roles: men as strong, rational, political, and the decision-making partner, and women as emotional, family-centered, and supportive. These programs are repackaged in additional audio and video formats. Red Ice also has premium, paywalled content. After shifting into the white supremacist space, Red Ice also began producing newscasts.

Lokteff's guests have included Lauren Southern and Faith Goldy, among others. In March 2018, Simon Roche, a spokesperson for the Suidlanders, a South African Afrikaner supremacist group, claimed in an appearance on Red Ice that it was deadlier to be a white farmer in South Africa than a police officer. Adolf Hitler was also described as "The Great One" on Red Ice's website. In April 2018, the SPLC said that Red Ice was "exploring white nationalism, antisemitism and Holocaust denial, and promoting the myth of white genocide."

Red Ice TV hosted videos for the white nationalist conference 'Awakening' held in Finland in April 2019.

In June 2023, Police Scotland launched an investigation into content published on BitChute that directed abuse and threats towards First Minister Humza Yousaf after receiving a complaint from his office. The content included several Red Ice videos featuring Lokteff, one of which called for Yousaf to "go back" to Pakistan and accused him of trying to "infiltrate and destroy white Scottish culture and heritage".

The recording studio is based in the Idaho panhandle.

== History ==
In 2002, Henrik Palmgren started Red Ice in Gothenburg.

In August 2017, Henrik Palmgren said that hackers had taken down the Red Ice website and were going to release names of 23,000 subscribing members. This event occurred alongside the hacking of several other neo-Nazi and alt-right platforms. On other hacked sites at the time, the actions were claimed in the name of the decentralized group Anonymous.

In September 2018, YouTube limited some videos by Red Ice after it posted a video claiming that white women were being "pushed" into interracial relationships.

In April 2019, comments and monetization were disabled by YouTube on a livestream of a House Judiciary Committee hearing hosted by Palmgren and Lokteff due to commenters' use of anti-Semitic slurs, white nationalist memes, and derogatory remarks about women in the hearing.

In June 2019, Red Ice's YouTube channel was demonetized due to YouTube's recently expanded policy guidelines, which prohibited videos "promoting or glorifying Nazi ideology," spreading Holocaust denial and rejecting "well-documented events" like the Sandy Hook Elementary School shooting. In October 2019, the channel was banned for hate speech violations. The channel had about 330,000 subscribers. Lokteff and Red Ice promoted a backup channel in an attempt to circumvent the ban. A week later, the backup channel was also removed by YouTube.

In November 2019, Facebook banned Red Ice from using its platform.

== Influence ==
In August 2017, Red Ice had 130,000 YouTube subscribers. By April 2019, it had over 300,000 subscribers and by October, 335,000 subscribers and 44.7 million total views. In November 2019, it had 90,000 followers on Facebook. As of June 2023, Red Ice maintains a social media presence on BitChute, Odysee, Telegram, VK, Rumble and Gab.
