= Lauren Southern =

Canadian political activist (born 1995)

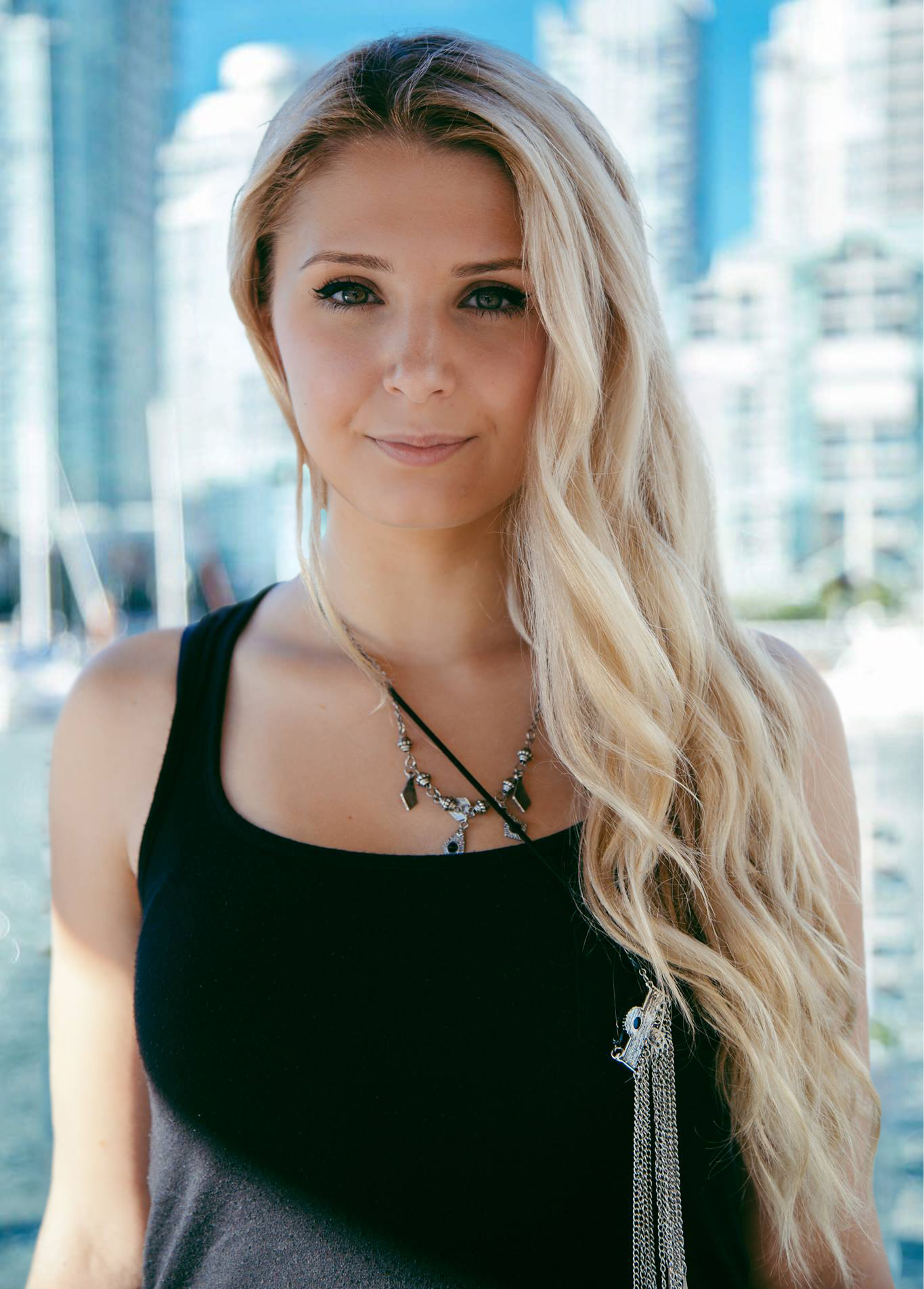
- Southern in 2016
- Born: Lauren Cherie Southern; 16 June 1995 (age 31); Surrey, British Columbia, Canada
- Occupation: Political activist
- Political party: Libertarian
- Children: 1

YouTube information
- Channel: Lauren Southern
- Years active: 2015–present
- Subscribers: 695 thousand
- Views: 50.9 million
- Last updated: April 23, 2026
- Website: laurensouthern.net

Lauren Cherie Southern (born 16 June 1995) is a Canadian YouTuber, influencer and political activist who rose to prominence through alt-right political commentary. (Note: Sources describing Southern as "alt-right" include: Neiwert, David. "The Far Right Descends on Berkeley for 'Free Speech' and Planned Violence". Hatewatch. Southern Poverty Law Center. Archived from the original on 17 August 2017.; Wildman, Sarah. "A European alt-right group wants to take to the sea to stop rescuers from saving migrants". Vox. Archived from the original on 6 July 2017.; Mortimer, Caroline (20 July 2017). "Far-right activists stopped as they try to block refugee rescue in the Mediterranean". The Independent.; Leah, Rachel (4 December 2017). ""Alt-right" women are upset that "alt-right" men are treating them terribly". Salon. Archived from the original on 4 December 2017.; Warren, James (7 December 2017). "How women of the alt-right are attacked viciously – by the men of the alt-right". Poynter.; Cunningham, Melissa (19 July 2018). "Far-right mouthpiece Lauren Southern 'hit with hefty police bill'". The Age. "Lauren Southern has become the second controversial alt-right commentator to be slapped with a hefty police bill ahead of her controversial show in Melbourne."; Laruelle, Marlene; Rivera, Ellen (April 2019). "Collusion or Homegrown Collaboration? Connections between German Far Right and Russia" (PDF). Political Capital Policy Research and Consulting Institute. p. 14.; Brook, Stephen; Hutchinson, Samantha (1 October 2020). "Alt-right activist Lauren Southern dumped from Conservative conference". The Sydney Morning Herald. Archived from the original on 5 October 2020.; Lombroso, Daniel (16 October 2020). "Why the Alt-Right's Most Famous Woman Disappeared". The Atlantic. Archived from the original on 15 November 2020. "Southern was only in her early 20s, but she had already emerged as the alt-right's most influential woman.") Southern worked for Rebel Media until March 2017, when she began to work independently.

In May 2017, Southern supported Defend Europe in their efforts to obstruct search-and-rescue operations of refugees from North Africa in the Mediterranean Sea. Southern was briefly detained by the Italian Coast Guard for blocking a ship embarking on a search-and-rescue mission. Consequently, crowdfunding website Patreon removed her from the platform, accusing her of engaging in activity "likely to cause loss of life".

Some academics and journalists have described Southern as a white nationalist for her promotion of the Great Replacement and white genocide conspiracy theories, (Note: Sources discussing Southern in relation to white nationalism include: Lombroso, Daniel (16 October 2020). "Why the Alt-Right's Most Famous Woman Disappeared". The Atlantic. Archived from the original on 15 November 2020. "By the time Southern went on McInnes's show, I had been following her for nearly a year. I was making a documentary for The Atlantic about the white-nationalist movement, called White Noise. I'd already become accustomed to the accommodations Southern made to stay within a movement whose hatreds are prolific. (Southern denies being a white nationalist.)"; Wilson, Jason (9 August 2020). "Lauren Southern is on the comeback trail, and Australian conservatives are all too happy to help". The Guardian. "And when it comes down to it, there isn't much daylight between the politics of Southern, which are white nationalist, and those of Australian conservatism as it has developed in recent decades."; Robison-Greene, Rachel; Greene, Richard (2020). Conspiracy Theories: Philosophers Connect the Dots. Open Court. p. 88. ISBN 978-0812694833. "Camus's notion of the Great Replacement has been spread by right-wing and white nationalist figures across the world. In July 2018, Lauren Southern, a Canadian alt-right figure posted, a video titled 'The Great Replacement' on YouTube that got over 250,000 views."; Martineau, Paris (23 October 2019). "Maybe It's Not YouTube's Algorithm That Radicalizes People". Wired. "those that express more explicitly white nationalist messages, like Stefan Molyneux and Lauren Southern."; Stern, Alexandra Minna (2019). Proud Boys and the White Ethnostate: How the Alt-Right Is Warping the American Imagination. Boston, Mass.: Beacon Press. p. 101. ISBN 978-0807063361. "As a home for the small but active alt-right sisterhood, Radio 3Fourteen brings together female alt-righters with their followers on social media. Regulars include ... Canadian white nationalists Lauren Southern and Faith Goldy"; Anderson, Wendy K Z (1 March 2018). "Classifying Whiteness: Unmasking White Nationalist Women's Digital Design through an Intersectional Analysis of Contained Agency". Communication, Culture and Critique. 11 (1): 116–132. doi:10.1093/ccc/tcy002. ISSN 1753-9129. "Second, although white nationalist speakers like Milo Yiannopoulos are being banned from speaking on campus, white nationalist women retain their seats at the table. Lauren Southern, following her presentation at the University of Minnesota..."; Strick, Simon (2020). "The Alternative Right, Masculinities, and Ordinary Affect". Right-Wing Populism and Gender. transcript Verlag. pp. 207–230. doi:10.1515/9783839449806-012. ISBN 978-3839449806 – via www.degruyter.com. "On behalf of Robinson, a diverse assortment of right-wing celebrities spoke at Whitehall: Canadian white nationalist Lauren Southern...") though she has denied being a white nationalist. Southern promoted the Great Replacement conspiracy theory via her YouTube video of the same name, released in July 2017; the video was reported to have helped to promote the white nationalist viewpoint, having garnered over 600,000 views by March 2019. She has been described as an advocate of the white genocide conspiracy theory for her documentary Farmlands (2018), in which she suggested the imminence of a race war in South Africa in response to South African farm attacks.

In July 2018, she visited Australia for a speaking tour with Stefan Molyneux; that August, the pair visited New Zealand intending on continuing the speaking tour, but this was cancelled after local government withdrew its permission to use a government-run venue. Southern announced her retirement from political activism on 2 June 2019, but returned to YouTube on 19 June 2020. As of 2021, she is a contributor for Sky News Australia. She has rejected the "far-right" label and said she is not a racist, preferring to be described as a conservative. In 2019, when making such denials to a journalist from The Times of London, Southern "end[ed] their conversation by predicting a race war."

== Early life ==
Southern was born in Surrey, British Columbia. She studied political science at the University of the Fraser Valley, but Southern left after two years.

On 18 October 2015, Southern was a candidate in the 2015 Canadian federal election representing the Libertarian Party in the district of Langley–Aldergrove. She was briefly removed by the party as a candidate but was reinstated with support from Breitbart News and The Rebel Media. The election was won by Conservative candidate Mark Warawa. Southern finished last, receiving 535 votes, or 0.9% of the total.

== Activism and views ==
Southern has been described as conservative, (Note: Sources describing Southern as "conservative" include: "Conservative YouTuber's U Of M Speech Expected To Draw Protesters – CBS Minnesota". CBS News. 24 October 2017.; "WA Police issue warning for Lauren Southern protesters". WAtoday. 22 July 2018.; Middlecamp, David (26 May 2017). "Conservative activist Lauren Southern speaks at Cal Poly". The Tribune (San Luis Obispo).) right-wing, (Note: Sources describing Southern as "right-wing" include: Hosenball, Mark (12 March 2018). "British authorities ban three foreign right-wing activists". Reuters.; Farrell, Jeff (14 August 2017). "Anti-immigrant ship trying to block refugees from crossing Mediterranean has funding cancelled". The Independent.; "Left-Wing Protesters Removed from Lauren Southern's Melbourne Talk". 21 July 2018.; "I was right about why Lauren Southern 'quit' white nationalism".) alt-right, and far-right. (Note: Sources describing Southern as "far-right" include: Gordon, Graeme (27 July 2017). "Why Lauren Southern Got Banned From Patreon". Canadaland. Archived from the original on 18 August 2017.; Wilson, Jason (24 August 2018). "White farmers: how a far-right idea was planted in Donald Trump's mind". The Guardian.; Baidawi, Adam (3 April 2018). "South Africa Says Australia Retracted Claim of 'Persecuted' White Farmers". The New York Times. Archived from the original on 16 April 2018.; "Canadian far-right activist Lauren Southern barred from Britain for anti-Muslim views". National Post. 12 March 2018.; Oppenheim, Maya (13 March 2018). "Far-right Canadian activist detained in Calais and banned from entering UK". The Independent. Archived from the original on 15 March 2018.; "Trump Retweets Far-Right YouTube Star in Attack on Social Media". Bloomberg. 2019. Archived from the original on 4 May 2019.; Whyte, Lara (28 September 2018). "The women flying the flag for Generation Identity and far-right politics". The Times.; Franco, Aaron (23 February 2021). "'You are not alone': Former far-right activists launch project to fight online radicalization". NBC News. "videos that received millions of views and helped propel far-right figures like Lauren Southern, Tommy Robinson and Infowars host Alex Jones into notoriety") Some academics and journalists have described Southern as a white nationalist, which she has denied. Southern also rejects the label "far-right", preferring to be described as a conservative. The Southern Poverty Law Center has characterized Southern's videos as "anti-feminist, xenophobic, Islamophobic diatribes" which "tiptoe at the precipice of outright white nationalism". She was interviewed by the London Times in 2019: "When we speak, Southern flatly denies being racist or even far right, then ends our conversation by predicting a race war and quoting Enoch Powell."

=== Media work ===
Before she left university, The Rebel Media founder Ezra Levant met Southern at a conference. He had been impressed by the questions she had asked the speakers and asked her to audition. She moved to Toronto to work in the website's offices. Her first video, "Why I Am Not A Feminist", appeared on the website in April 2015. She worked regularly with Milo Yiannopoulos and Faith Goldy while at Rebel Media and made multiple videos with both of them.

In October 2016, Southern had some documentation of her gender legally changed to male as part of a video produced for The Rebel Media to show the ease of Ontario's new gender ID laws.

In December 2016, Southern self-published a short book Barbarians: How Baby Boomers, Immigrants, and Islam Screwed My Generation. In the book, she wrote: "As far as I'm concerned, Hitler was just a SJW who happened to get freaky amounts of power and actually implement his #KillAllJews (the predecessor to #KillAllMen) worldview". According to her, Hitler "fawned over Muslims more sycophantically than Justin Trudeau." Barbarians gained a cover endorsement from Ann Coulter.

In March 2017, Southern announced she would be leaving The Rebel Media. In the same month, she gained access to White House press briefings. She has appeared on Lana Lokteff's program Radio 3Fourteen.

On 2 June 2019, Southern announced her retirement from political activism on her website. She stated that her reasons for leaving were that she needed to move on and find fulfillment in a more private capacity.

On 19 June 2020, Southern announced in a YouTube video her return and new plans, expressing some remorse for her previous hardline stances. Daniel Lombroso, in his article for The Atlantic, was skeptical of her change, stating: "She kept telling me she had grown more 'compassionate,' but whenever I asked her pointedly if she regretted her past work, I got obfuscation and tactical apologies."

She was interviewed by Tucker Carlson for an April 2023 film advocating for a US invasion of Canada.

In September 2024, two Russian state media employees were charged with secretly funnelling almost $10 million to a Tennessee company for the production of political videos to benefit Russia by influencing the United States. The company's description matches that of Tenet Media, which had employed Southern and several right-wing influencers, although the Justice Department didn't allege wrongdoing by any of Tenet's influencers. Southern's content for Tenet focused on topics such as anti-white sentiment, residential school grave sites and Canada's housing crisis, as well as anti-LGBT content.

=== Race and multiculturalism ===
Southern is against multiculturalism. Her public statements vilifying immigrants caused controversy during her 2018 tour in Oceania.

Southern has called the Black Lives Matter movement a "terrorist organisation", and a "divisive, violent movement that has fascistic tendencies".

Influenced by the French political writer Renaud Camus, Southern promotes the Great Replacement conspiracy theory, which posits that non-white immigration of Muslims will lead to a genocide of white Europeans. She released a YouTube video under this title in July 2017, which was credited with helping to promote a white nationalist viewpoint. By August 2020, the video could only be accessed privately on Southern's home channel. She has described the theory as: "You have one people and in the space of one generation you have a different people".

Southern has defended the American neo-Nazi Richard B. Spencer, who has advocated for violence against non-whites on multiple occasions. Southern has said "Richard Spencer is not a white supremacist, he is a white nationalist. He believes in a white ethnostate, he doesn't believe in whites being superior." Spencer has praised Southern's videos.

Southern has been described as a proponent of the white genocide conspiracy theory. In 2018, Southern produced a documentary called Farmlands which falsely claimed that racially motivated farm attacks in South Africa may represent an impending genocide, a common talking point for white nationalists. While producing the documentary, Southern worked with Charlottesville Unite the Right rally attendee Simon Roche, a spokesperson for the ethnonationalist (Völkisch) Afrikaner organization Suidlanders, an organization which predicts a race war. In August 2018 she was interviewed by Michael Savage where they discussed the topics raised by her documentary and her travels to South Africa.

=== Opposition to NGOs, refugees, and migration ===
In May 2017, Southern, along with Martin Sellner and Brittany Pettibone, took part in an attempt organized by the Identitarian group Génération identitaire to block the passage of an NGO ship, the Aquarius (co-owned by SOS Mediterranée and by Doctors without Borders), which was leaving Sicily for a search-and-rescue mission for ship-wrecked refugees and migrants off the shores of Northern Africa in the Mediterranean Sea. Claiming that the goal of the activists "was to stop an empty boat from going down to Libya and filling up with illegal migrants", Southern was briefly detained by the Italian Coast Guard. NGO ships often rescue migrants and refugees, who embark from Libyan shores on unsafe makeshift rafts, and bring them to Sicily. Regarding her actions, Southern stated: "if the politicians won't stop the boats, we'll stop the boats."

Southern supported similar actions by Defend Europe, which chartered a vessel to track and stop what it claimed was collusion between non-governmental organizations (NGOs) and human traffickers. In July 2017, Southern reported Patreon had deleted her account citing concerns about her "raising funds in order to take part in activities that are likely to cause loss of life". Southern denied these allegations, stating that Defend Europe's actions were likely to save lives and that none of her funding went towards the group.

In November 2018, Southern released a video that appeared to show an NGO worker admitting that she had coached asylum seekers on how to speak to immigration officials in order to gain refugee status. BuzzFeed News reported that a United Nations High Commissioner for Refugees (UNHCR) spokesperson said: "Greece has rigorous asylum procedures in place, within a robust legal framework." In May 2019, Southern released a YouTube documentary, Borderless, about the refugee and migrant crisis. The film was temporarily taken down by YouTube.

=== Gender and feminism ===
Southern said transgender people have a "genuine delusion", adding "It's body dysmorphia and that is a mental illness". She criticised legal recognition for changing one's gender, because people doing so might be dishonest.

Southern has spoken in opposition to feminism and has said that women are "not psychologically developed to hold leadership positions", and "not going to be as great being CEOs". In a November 2017 YouTube video titled "Why I'm Not Married", Southern said: "I am not trying to sell the idea that myself, as a 22-year-old, needs to be married right now for the sake of traditionalism and not being a degenerate. What is also just completely shocking to me is the utter lack of understanding of nuance." She also said that women should be able to choose their own path in life without being attacked for it.

In June 2015, Southern reported on the Vancouver SlutWalk, a protest march of sexual assault survivors, for The Rebel Media. She said her protest sign stating "There Is No Rape Culture in the West", was torn up. She shouted to the protest in response: "Go to Africa and you will see a real rape culture!". In Third World countries, she said, "men can get away with rape". According to Southern: "It's insane to focus on this one issue and say that we are living in a rape culture. Men are getting fired from their jobs just for making rape jokes – not raping". A protester from a Canadian rape crisis centre told her fewer than an estimated 10% of rapes are reported.

In a 2017 YouTube segment titled "How Feminism Made Women Unhappy", Southern said: "Traditionalism offers a lot of stability in people's life, it offers a guide for how to lead them to the happiest life." Together with Tara McCarthy and Brittany Pettibone, she advocated for women to have fewer sexual partners, saying that the left holds "a cultural Marxist agenda that wants to destroy the family."

== Visits and bans ==
During March 2016, she visited Vancouver for an event at which Augustus Sol Invictus was due to appear. A fringe candidate for a Florida senate seat, Invictus was banned from entering Canada and was absent. At this event, a protester poured a bottle of urine over Southern's head while she was engaging with LGBTQ protesters at a rally in Vancouver, arguing for two human genders.

In April 2017, Southern was one of several scheduled speakers at a Patriots' Day rally in Berkeley, California. The rally led to a riot between pro-Trump demonstrators and anti-Trump counter-protesters.

In June 2018, she visited Moscow, Russia, to meet Aleksandr Dugin, a political philosopher and proponent of a Russian-dominated Eurasia. A multi-part interview of Dugin, conducted by Southern and Brittany Pettibone, was published on YouTube under the title "From Russia With Love". "It’s incorrect to call him a fascist," Southern tweeted. In the second video, she said Dugin had both "enthralled" and "open[ed] so many doors" for her. Dugin spoke on a panel with the two women in Moscow.

Websites for crowdfunding (GoFundMe) and business services (Patreon) barred Southern from using their services. YouTube demonetized her channel by June 2017 and was no longer running advertisements on it.

=== Ban on entering the United Kingdom ===
In February 2018, Southern, along with Pettibone and Caolan Robertson, distributed flyers in the English town of Luton describing Allah as "gay", as part of a social experiment video.

In March 2018, Southern was denied entry to the United Kingdom while waiting in Calais. It was reported that Southern was due to meet Austrian Martin Sellner and his American partner, Pettibone, both far-right activists, while the three of them were in Britain; the couple were deported from Britain a few days earlier. Southern was questioned under Schedule 7 of the Terrorism Act 2000. Her denial of entry was due to her intentions during her visit.

Tucker Carlson of Fox News, describing Southern and the others as reporters, invited Katie Hopkins onto his programme to defend them against supposed political correctness responsible for their non-admission.

=== 2018 Australian tour ===
Before her period of residency in Australia during her brief retirement and afterwards, Southern planned a speaking tour of Australia in July 2018. Australia's Department of Home Affairs denied Lauren Southern an Electronic Travel Authority visa, saying it was "not a working visa". She intended to charge $79 for a basic ticket and up to $749 for an "intimate dinner". The Australian government allowed her to enter the country once she had the correct visa. Arriving at Brisbane airport, she wore an "It's OK to be white" shirt.

When she asked people on the street in Melbourne "Should we kill Lauren Southern?", many had never heard of her. A speaking event in Melbourne was opposed by more than 100 protesters.

There were no protesters at her event in Sydney, where ticket holders were notified of the venue by receiving a text on the day. The Sydney event included a $200 meet-and-greet, a $500 VIP meet-and-greet and a $750 dinner.

In Brisbane, Southern mentioned bombing the Australian city of Melbourne, citing and expanding upon the Bible story about finding good people in Sodom and Gomorrah. She ended: "We did find a few hundred good ones there – there is a silent majority I believe in Melbourne so we can’t nuke it yet guys I’m sorry." The joke did not go down well with many. She was opposed by around 60 protesters.

=== 2018 New Zealand tour ===
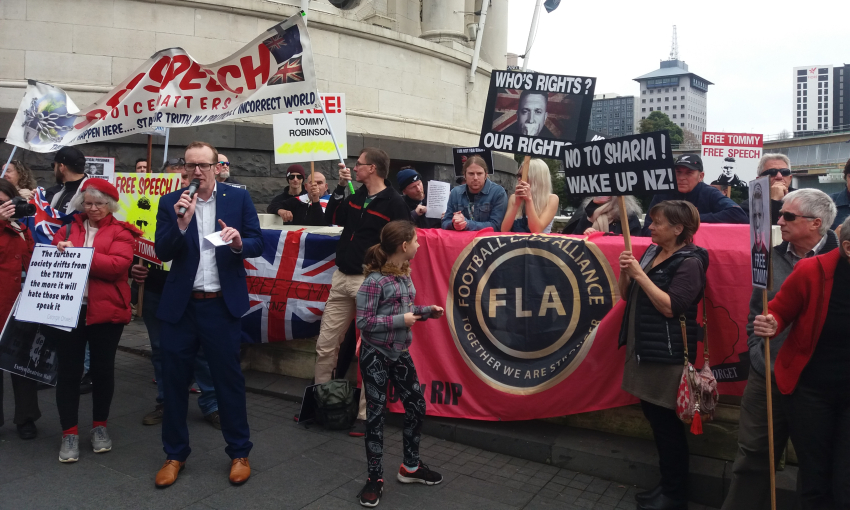
Libertarian politician Stephen Berry speaking at the free speech protest in defence of Southern and Molyneux, Auckland 2018

In July 2018, Southern applied for a travel visa to visit New Zealand for a speaking tour with Canadian podcaster and YouTuber Stefan Molyneux. Immigration Minister Iain Lees-Galloway described their views as "repugnant" but said they met immigration character requirements and cleared their entry. The pair had not secured a venue, as Auckland Council had cancelled their initial booking, citing health and safety concerns. The pair briefly cancelled and then resumed the tour over difficulties with the venue. The subsequent booking of a private venue was revoked by its owners. In retaliation, their venue was vandalised. The failure to find a venue was celebrated by around 1,000 protesters, who said the planned event had nothing to do with freedom of speech. Prime Minister Jacinda Ardern said New Zealand is "hostile" to the views of the speakers and, "I think you'll see from the reaction they've had from New Zealanders that their views are not those that are shared by this country, and I'm quite proud of that".

In August 2018, the Mayor of Auckland, Phil Goff, tweeted that Council venues should not be used to "stir up ethnic or religious tensions", and that "we've got no obligation at all" to provide a venue for hate speech. For agreeing with the cancellation, Green Party co-leader Marama Davidson received death threats.

Tāmaki Anti Fascist Action spokesperson Sina Brown-Davis said her group feared "dehumanising depictions of indigenous people" in New Zealand. Molyneux had called Aboriginal and Torres Strait Islander people "the lowest rung of civilisation".

Green Party co-leader Marama Davidson added, "Aotearoa does not stand for your messages of racism, hatred and especially white supremacy". Justice Minister Andrew Little said the speakers "clearly have misled people" in trying to secure the venue. TV personality Te Hamua Nikora said the pair were against multiculturalism, unlike New Zealand. The minimum ticket price for the cancelled Auckland event was $99.

== Personal life ==
=== Sexual assault allegation against Andrew Tate ===
Southern wrote in her 2025 self-published memoir This Is Not Real Life that she had met Andrew Tate in Romania in 2018 with the intention of convincing him and his brother Tristan Tate to invest in a right-wing business of hers. She said in the book that, after he had taken her from a nightclub to her hotel room, "He kissed me. I wasn’t expecting it, and I wasn't looking for it, but I kissed him back briefly and then told him I wanted to sleep." She said that, after he insisted on touching her and she tried to fight back, he "put his arm around my neck and began strangling me unconscious. I tried to fight back…. I'd prefer not to share the rest. It's pretty obvious." Southern said in the book that the episode was one of the reasons why she had decided to leave the right-wing political sphere.

She told the New Yorker that she had been certain she could not "retain my status within the right-wing world" if she spoke about it. She recalled acknowledging to Tate immediately after the incident that her "whole brand" involved blaming women for "get[ting] themselves in situations like this", and thus she did not see a way to report her own victimization "without destroying my career."

=== Return to Canada ===
In June 2023, Southern moved back to Canada from Australia with her son after her ex-husband left her.
