= YouTube Instant =

Real-time search engine

- Developer: Feross Aboukhadijeh
- Release: 10 September 2010
- Written in: JavaScript, jQuery
- Available in: English
- Website: ytinstant.com

YouTube Instant is a real-time search engine built and launched in September 2010 by nineteen-year-old college student and Facebook-software-engineer intern Feross Aboukhadijeh of Stanford University that allows its users to search the YouTube video database as they type. It follows on the heels of Google Instant, and has been described as a "novelty toy", a "prototypal digit to tie the "instant" bandwagon" as well as a "completely excellent way to waste 15 minutes".

Aboukhadijeh was offered a job from YouTube CEO Chad Hurley shortly after he created the site. At the point of YouTube Instant's creation, Aboukhadijeh was a summer intern at Facebook, and has said that he was working on a secret Facebook project.

== Origins ==
The launch of YouTube Instant was announced by Aboukhadijeh on Y Combinator’s Hacker News feed. It is modelled after Google Instant — as a user types in the video they are looking for, "the engine guesses the video and begins playing it immediately."

The project started off as a bet with his college roommate. Aboukhadijeh was quoted as saying, "It started out as a bet with my roommate, Jake Becker. I bet him I could build real-time YouTube search in less than an hour." Aboukhadijeh lost the bet, for it took him three hours to complete the site, and another couple hours to polish it. Aboukhadijeh said he found it "surprisingly easy to build".

Aboukhadijeh built the site by using the YouTube API. He scraped YouTube search suggestions because Google blocked his server for making far too many repeated requests to the search suggestion endpoint. Aboukhadijeh had to re-write the site to instead query YouTube directly for search suggestions, "eliminating the round-trip to [his] server", in order to address the problem.

== Description ==
The YouTube Instant interface, which looks similar to the YouTube front page consists of a box designed for a user to type in his search letter or phrase. As each letter of the search phrase is typed in, the server goes out into "YouTube video land" and tries to find matches for the search term similarly to current Google Instant search.

YouTube Instant is essentially a free utility that strips down the normal YouTube interface to easily include a search bar, as well as a single and central video display as well as five smaller displays below it to present the top five searches based on the user's input. As the user types in text into the search bar, YouTube Instant instantly identifies a best match and, after a short pause to confirm that the user is happy with the match, plays the video in the central display. Beneath this, users are also presented with a smaller version of the file that is being played with a simple play and pause function as well as four other strong matches that the user can opt to select and play in the central panel instead.

YouTube Instant, as Aboukhadijeh said, would be most useful when one is "looking for a serendipitous video browsing experience". In comparison with Google Instant, it might not be as useful if "you know exactly what you’re looking for, since you’re shown distracting YouTube videos on the way to your destination", said Aboukhadijeh. He continues by saying that he thinks this is perfect for many internet users.

YouTube Instant presents itself as a "streamlined, neatly presented microcosm" of the YouTube universe, providing a simple means of finding and playing a specific file. Like Google Instant, when the user starts typing into the search bar, the utility looks for matches and presents a file name to the right of the bar. This changes as typing continues, predicting the best fit based on the input. Output is virtually ‘instant’ and reduces the time taken to find a file compared to the full version of YouTube.

== Limitations ==
YouTube Instant possesses very little of the functionality offered by YouTube. Both the name of the file and the user name of the individual that uploaded it are not shown to the user. Also, there are no account-based features either, so the user cannot, for example, log into his/her existing YouTube account and add a file to his/her favorites.

== Public response ==
Aboukhadijeh was quoted as saying "there was craziness," describing the response to the creation of YouTube Instant. And by "craziness," Aboukhadijeh referred to the viral whirlwind that was generated: he was greeted by e-mails congratulating him, interview requests, and a server flooded with Web traffic. Within six days, YouTube Instant had seen 715,000 visitors. There was news coverage by media outlets such as the New York Times, Sydney Morning Herald, and Washington Post. Perhaps one of the puzzles of the buzz that YouTube Instant has created is how YouTube Instant went viral. "I think after things cool down a bit, I should carefully consider how exactly YouTube Instant went viral and write up a blog post to share my thoughts about it all," Aboukhadijeh has said.

== Meeting with Chad Hurley ==
Most notable was the job offer from YouTube CEO Chad Hurley via Twitter. "Want a Job?" Hurley asked, to which Aboukhadijeh, who uses the Twitter handle FreeTheFeross, replied, "Is that a for-real offer?" Hurley then asked if Aboukhadijeh was "ready to leave school." A meeting between Aboukhadijeh and Hurley at YouTube's San Bruno, California, headquarters was scheduled for September 13, 2010. Aboukhadijeh stated "I haven't actually accepted the YouTube offer yet. We're still figuring out how this is all going to work out, and nothing's final yet. However, Chad and the engineers I spoke with were excited about the possibilities." MediaMemo however claimed that Aboukhadijeh "can't go work for Chad Hurley, because he’s already working for Mark Zuckerberg". Aboukhadijeh disagreed with this claim, telling CNN that he did not see how working at Facebook over summer would "prohibit his taking a job at YouTube".

== Spin-offs ==
There was suddenly a rush to develop an ‘Instant’ version of every popular online brand. Shortly after the creation of YouTube Instant came the creation of Google Maps Instant, iTunes Instant, Instant Dictionary, Instant PubMed, WikInstant.com, Instant Wikipedia. In particular, it was Michael Hart who put Google Images Instant together in less than two hours. He accompanied both apps with a notice that says: "Btw, Google: I’m looking for a job too! Congrats Feross Aboukhadijeh!", a direct reference to YouTube Co-Founder and CEO Chad Hurley's public job offer to the person behind YouTube Instant. It was Scottish engineer Tam Denholm who decided to wrap another layer around the concept of "instantization" by creating a mashup of these services called "Instantise," "which slaps all instant-based Web activity onto a single landing page for easier discovery and use."

== See also ==
- Social impact of YouTube
