= Framasoft =

French free software organisation

- Formation: 2001 (25 years ago) for the network, 2003 for the organisation
- Type: non-profit organisation
- Legal status: Association
- Purpose: Educational
- Headquarters: Lyon, France
- Region served: Worldwide
- Members: Anyone
- Official language: French
- Website: www.framasoft.org

Framasoft is an education-oriented social network created in November 2001 by Alexis Kauffmann, Paul Lunetta, and Georges Silva. Since 2014, it has been supported by a nonprofit organization of the same name based in Lyon, France. Mainly focused on free software valorisation, it is divided into three main branches of activity based upon a collaborative model: promotion, dissemination, and development of free software, enrichment of the free culture movement, and online services.

Framasoft is one of the main French language portals to the free and open-source culture providing a space for orientation, information, news, exchange, and projects. Its community regularly brings resources and assistance to people who would like to get started with free software. They also partner with people wishing to replace their proprietary software with open-source solutions at any step of the migration from proprietary to free software, such as Microsoft Windows to Linux.

The entire Framasoft production is provided under free license in order to promote participation and enable anyone to benefit from it. Framasoft explicitly states that it operates as a non-profit organization, distinct from corporate entities.

== Framasoft network ==
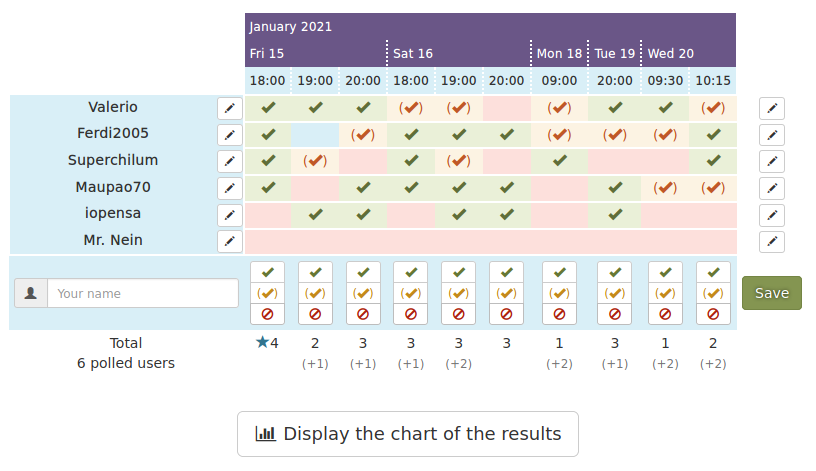
Framadate, a polling software, is part of the Framasoft network.

Framasoft network has around thirty projects with as many websites, usually named with a prefix "frama" and an independent ".org" as domain name. Those projects belong to three main categories: free and open-source software, free culture and open-source online services.

- The "free software" category is composed of a directory (Framalibre), a portable Application on USB drive (Framakey), a DVD (Framadvd), a software distributor (Framapack) and a list of the greatest free software projects (Framastart).
- The "free culture" category contains a news blog (Framablog), a Publishing (Framabook), an Anglo-French and a Spanish-French translation team (Framalang), a video platform (Framatube, a Peertube instance), and website to promote free music (Framazic).
- The "online open source services" category contains more than 30 services: a text editor (Framapad, MyPads) and a spreadsheet (Framacalc), both collaboratives, a meeting planning and survey (Framadate), Mind-map (Framindmap) and vectorial drawing (Framavectoriel). Users also have access to a search engine (Framabee: 2022-02: now just a redirect), 2 social networks(Framasphère and Framapiaf), an interesting articles save service (Framabag) and a news service (Framanews: 2022-02: now just a redirect). Framabin (since 2022-02 no own service but just a redirect to hosters) permits to share notes, Framapics images, and Framalink is an URL shortener. Lastly, Framagit is a Forge easing collaborative programs development. All these services are personal data; and private life can be respectfully decentralized on one's own server by following guides available on Framacloud.
- The network also has an internet forum called Framacolibri and an online shopping site, EnVenteLibre.

== Network history ==
=== Early days ===
In October 1998, Publication in ''Québec Science'' magazine of "Comment informatiser intelligemment les écoles" (How to put information technology in schools in a smart way) by Jean-Claude Guédon. "This article stroke Alexis Kauffmann so much that we can consider it to have led to the creation of Framasoft".

November 2001 is the official date of the creation of Framasoft website, which is the first network created by mathematic teacher Alexis Kauffmann. The name comes from "Framanet" (for FRench and MAthematics on an intraNET), an educational project made with Caroline d'Atabekian, a literature teacher, within a Seine-Saint-Denis middleschool. Framasoft began as a software section of this project, before getting its independence, acting as a free software directory for Windows.

In June 2002, Framasoft and AFUL started the campaign « Libérons les logiciels à l'école » ("Let's free softwares at school"). In September 2002, the website included tutorials and an open forum.

In July 2003, the website closed due to bandwidth overload on the shared host Amen. The website receives widespread support and Amen became a partner of Framasoft, offering new hosting possibilities .

=== As an association ===
In January 2004, Framasoft evolves with the creation of the Framasoft Association. The directory drops Freeware and is no longer restricted to Windows software. It became a collaborative project written by Thomas Cézard, Simon Leblanc, Paul Lunetta, Rui Nibau and Georges Silva. Subsequently, in February 2004, birth of the Framagora forum administered by Thierry Bernard.

In March 2005, a French translation of TheOpenCD 2.0, a CD compilation of free software on Windows was released. Published in a special page of the magazine fr:Freelog in June, the CD was also shipped on the Ikarios mail order site of Nat Makarevitch. August 2005 saw the publication of the first version of Framakey and the creation of an associated site by Pierre-Yves Gosset. In December 2005, Framagora experienced a peak in traffic by becoming the main forum for monitoring enforcement of the DADVSI law.

In February 2007, the second book of the Framabook collection was published: "Simple like Ubuntu 6.10" by Didier Roche, which will later be reedited and updated. In June 2007, Framasoft received the "Lutèce d'Or" for "the best conducted community action" during the event Paris Capitale du Libre. In August 2007, Framasoft added AdSense to its website, after a Framablog post reporting financial difficulties to host the network.

In January 2008, a third book in the Framabook's collection was published: Spip pratique 1.9, by Perline, followed in March 2008 by Change for OpenOffice.org, a translation coordinated by Johann Bulteau (alias Yostral). According to fr:Wikio in June 2008, the Framablog article Firefox : and 1, and 2, and 3.0 ! has been the most cited article of the month in the French speaking blogosphere.

In January 2009, Framasoft set up a support website dedicated to collect donations and testimonies. February 2009 saw the start of the Framatube video project. In March 2009, the Framakey added some portable web applications, the « WebApps », to its catalogue. In May 2009, the sixth book of the Framabook collection is published: it is a comic called Geekscottes - 1. PATH, le chemin by Nojhan. In the meantime, a booklet Sésamath is distributed in all French high schools, containing a double-spread about free software and Framasoft and the Framadvd DVD. Another distribution the year after was set by masters students in multimedia and communications at Panthéon-Assas University. In June 2009, Framablog occupies the first position in the Wikio ranking of French blogs in the "Free Software" category.

In January 2010, while the Framapack project is online, the documentary Richard Stallman et la révolution du logiciel libre was published. For the occasion, éditions Eyrolles organized in Paris a meeting with Richard Stallman. In May 2010, Framasoft demonstrated to defend free software against the censorship of the exhibition « true exhib talking about the false » about counterfeiting, at Cité des sciences et de l'Industrie. In October 2010, the association starts supporting financially the campaign « 1000 10 1 » to find 1000 patrons to contribute at 10 euros by month for one year. Framadvd school version was also published during that time, a project led by Cyrille Largillier. In January 2011, a new publication appeared in the Framabook collection called Produire du logiciel libre by Karl Fogel, as a collaborative translation. In March 2011, the project Framapad is online, followed in June 2011 by Framadate. In July 2011, publication of the cartoon GKND tome 2 : Le GNU du risque by Simon Giraudot in the Framabook's collection. Framasoft celebrated its 10 years with a radio show Place de la toile on France Culture in November 2011.

In February 2012, start the support campaign « Liberty Pack » with April, Framasoft and La Quadrature du Net. In October 2012, the first novel of the Framabook's collection is out #Smartarded - Le cycle des NoéNautes, I by Pouhiou. It also sees the release of the projets Framacalc, Framindmap, and Framavectoriel. In November 2012, Framasoft launch its 2013 support campaign and put online the Framazic project. In December 2012, launch of « Liberty Pack 2 », new support campaign shared with April and La quadrature du Net.

In January 2013, Framasoft joins other organisations such as Savoirscom1, Regards citoyens or the Open Knowledge Foundation France to refuse privatisation of domaine public by the Bibliothèque nationale de France. April 2013 sees an update of Framasoft main welcome page, then in September 2013, Framasoft announces its support to the « Romaine Lubrique »'s project about public domain cultural valuation.

=== De-google-ify Internet ===
In June 2014, a crowdfunding campaign allowed Framasoft to add new features to Framapad, followed in October 2014 by the launch of the "De-google-ify Internet" campaign ("Dégooglisons Internet" in French). The association has launched its own social media too: Framasphère.

In March 2015, a new functionality was added to Framapad to avoid flooding servers with unused text. It became also possible to choose the data conservation time. In the meantime, the association developed a picture sharing tool (FramaPic) and an URL shortener (Huit.re / frama.link). Framasoft also took the opportunity to start their own code body hosting called Forge. In May 2015, Framasoft started a new web search engine service (Framabee), in order to continue demonstrating that alternatives to Google are possible.

In October 2016, phase 2 of the De-google-ify campaign started and lead into the release of 6 new services:

- Framalistes: managing mailing lists
- Framanotes: dealing with all sorts of contents
- Framaforms: managing forms
- Framatalk: audio/video chat
- Framagenda: creating public or private calendars

In 2019, they started developing Mobilizon, a project to allow communities to organise events without depending on tech giants' platforms.

== Network organization ==
The association "Framasoft" was founded in January 2004, about 3 years after first the publication of the web site.

As Framasoft became a large collaborative project, it became necessary to provide the technical infrastructure for a growing network, such as ownership of domain names associated with a legal entity. This was to accompany projects coherently so they were part of a whole (starting with guaranteeing the open-source and free nature of the created resources) and to represent Framasoft through its interventions in the field.

This association aims "to promote and disseminate the free culture and especially the open-source software culture". The founding is mainly based upon gift economy from users, collected through the Internet.

The association take part in many events, whether while giving conferences, or having a place, for example during the "Rencontres mondiales du logiciel libre" (''RMLL'', from 2004 until 2014), the first "Rencontres mondiales décentralisées du logiciel libre" in Saint-Joseph on the island of Réunion (from 2006 until 2014), "Paris Capitale du Libre" (from 2006 until 2008), the "Salon de l'Éducation" (from 2004 until 2006), the "Fête de l'Humanité" (from 2004 until 2009, and 2014) and also during many Install parties and local "Freeware Day" organized by GULL, like "Ubuntu Party" in Paris (from 2008 until 2011) and in Toulouse (from 2009 to 2010) or like JDLL in Lyon (from 2007 until 2010).

The association is a member of the April, of Wikimedia France and of the association of French-speaking freeware users AFUL. It collaborates with websites like Linuxfr, La Quadrature du Net, the Tristan Nitot Standblog or the formats ouverts's blog about open formats by Thierry Stœhr. In relation and support in the educator sector for initiatives (Sésamath, Scideralle, AbulÉdu, Developers and free software users Association for administration and territorials collectivities (Adullact) etc.) and cultural (Dogmazic, Copyleft Attitude, Creative Commons France, Divergence FM, etc.).

== Notes and references ==
=== Works cited ===
- Gévaudan, Camille (2 November 2014a). "Avec Framasoft, l'appli fait de la résistance". Libération (in French). Archived from the original on 3 November 2014.
- Gévaudan, Camille (24 June 2014b). "Framapad : des sous pour libérer le traitement de texte en ligne". Libération (in French). Archived from the original on 27 June 2014.
- Goncalves, James (17 July 2003). "Framasoft ressuscite plus tôt que prévu". Linuxfr (in French).
- Piquard, Alexandre (9 Jul 2003). "Un annuaire de logiciels libres victime de son succès. Suspendu par son hébergeur, Framasoft suscite un élan de solidarité". Transfert.net (in French).
- Rees, Marc (2 September 2009). "FramaDVD, la compilation qui carbure au libre, est disponible". Next INpact (in French).
- Rocard, Gilles (22 September 2005). "Tout un bureau… sur une clé USB!". ZDNet (in French).
- Rousseaux, Agnès (25 September 2013). "L'univers de la culture libre et non-marchande a sa galaxie : Framasoft". Basta ! (in French).

== See also ==
Others projects:

- PeerTube
- Sepia Search
- Open-source software
- Open source
- HandyLinux
- Mandriva Linux
