= Meniko =

Village in Nicosia District, Cyprus

Meniko: Μένικο (Greek); Meniko (Turkish)
- Location in Cyprus
- Coordinates: 35°6′44″N 33°8′46″E
- Country: Cyprus
- District: Nicosia District

Population (2001)
  - Total: 980
- Time zone: UTC+2 (EET)
  - Summer (DST): UTC+3 (EEST)

Meniko (Greek: Μένικο; Turkish: Meniko) is a village in the Nicosia District of Cyprus, several kilometers away from its border with Northern Cyprus. Located in the centre of the town is the Greek Orthodox church, dedicated to the martyrs Saints Cyprian and Justina. The community celebrates this church's Feast Day yearly on 2 October.
