= Lana Lokteff =

American white supremacist

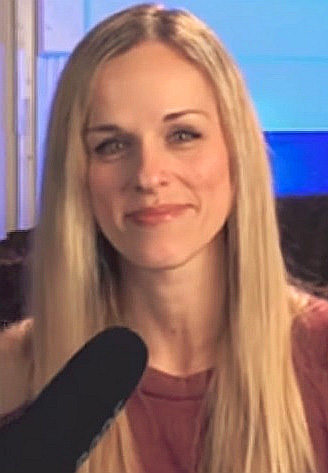
- Lokteff on Virtue of the West in 2017
- Born: Lana Jennifer Lokteff; March 14, 1979 (age 47); Oregon, U.S.
- Occupations: Far-right activist, vlogger, former YouTuber
- Spouse: Henrik Palmgren
- Children: 3
- Website: redice.tv/radio-3fourteen

Lana Jennifer Lokteff (born March 14, 1979) is an American far-right, antisemitic conspiracy theorist and white supremacist, who is part of the alt-right movement. She became a prominent YouTube personality before being banned. She is the host of Radio 3Fourteen.

== Early life ==
Lokteff was born in Oregon and is of Russian descent. Her parents were immigrants who fled the Bolsheviks. She has an older brother.

During high school, Lokteff started listening to Coast to Coast AM, a talk show featuring guests who promoted conspiracy theories. She planned to study physics and philosophy at Portland State University, but later dropped out.

== Career ==
=== Early career ===
Lokteff moved to Los Angeles to pursue a career in entertainment. She initially worked as a model before transitioning into the music and film industries. According to Lokteff, she left because she was "too creative" to work in industries where entertainment projects were rejected by executives for being "too deep" or threatening to "wake people up".

Lokteff returned to Bend, Oregon to her family. In the early 2000s, the Lokteff family created Piggyback Records, a home-run label and recording studio. Lokteff and her brother started performing as a duo named Thirty Day Notice, with Lokteff doing all of the singing. After a few years, Piggyback's business faltered, and Lokteff went with her brother to Fiji. During her time overseas, Lokteff discovered Red Ice, a website run by Henrik Palmgren.

=== Red Ice and promotion of white supremacy ===
According to the Southern Poverty Law Center, Red Ice started in 2003 covering the paranormal and conspiracy theories before shifting to white nationalism and antisemitism. Lokteff and Palmgren have been jointly cited as an influential introduction to white nationalism by members of the far-right. Red Ice shifted around 2012 in response to what the couple perceived as anti-white sentiment coinciding with the Black Lives Matter movement.

Lokteff has denied the Holocaust and the Native American genocide in the United States.

Following the election of Donald Trump in 2016, Lokteff has attempted to increase the number of white women involved in the predominantly male-dominated alt-right movement, advocating for them to play a supporting role to men. Lokteff opposes feminism, claiming that it has made life more difficult for men and that feminism's goals of equality have already been achieved. She has also criticized some of the women who have accused Harvey Weinstein of sexual assault. New York magazine describes her as a "looks-obsessed eugenicist", quoting her as saying "The alt-right is a very attractive, very sexy bunch ... Matches are being made left and right of beautiful, intelligent couples. It's a eugenic process."

In 2018, Lokteff was a guest on the podcast of a Florida schoolteacher who used the pseudonym Tiana Dalichov. She used the podcast to encourage white nationalists to become schoolteachers to influence children.

In October 2019, Red Ice's YouTube channel was banned for hate speech violations. The channel had about 330,000 subscribers. Lokteff and Red Ice promoted a backup channel in an attempt to circumvent the ban. A week later, the backup channel was also removed by YouTube. In November 2019, Facebook banned Red Ice from using its platform.

== Personal life ==
In 2011, Lokteff married Palmgren. She has three children and lived in Charleston, South Carolina as of 2020. Lokteff identifies as a pagan. She says she has been trolled and threatened by men in the alt-right.
