= Journalism++ =

Network of service companies

- Industry: Datajournalism
- Founded: 2011
- Website: https://jplusplus.org/en/

Journalism++ (J++) is a network of private service companies specializing in datajournalism. Founded in 2011, it has chapters in Paris, Berlin, Stockholm, Porto, Amsterdam and Cologne.

== History ==
Journalism++ was founded in 2011 par Nicolas Kayser-Bril, Anne Lise Bouyer and Pierre Romera, three former employees of OWNI (fr), a Paris-based news website that pioneered datajournalism in France.

Between 2013 and 2016, Journalism++ coordinated the Migrants' Files project, which aimed at measuring the number of persons who died in their attempt to reach or stay in Europe since 2000, and the cost associated with the so-called Fortress Europe policies. The project brought together 25 journalists and was published by several media outlets, notably Süddeutsche Zeitung, Libération and Český rozhlas in 2014 and 2015. The collected data served as the basis for the database of the International Organization for Migration on the same topic, which started in 2014.

== Awards ==
The Migrants' Files project was awarded the GEN Data Journalism Award in 2014 and the European Press Prize in 2015.
