= Stefan Molyneux =

Irish-Canadian white nationalist podcaster (born 1966)

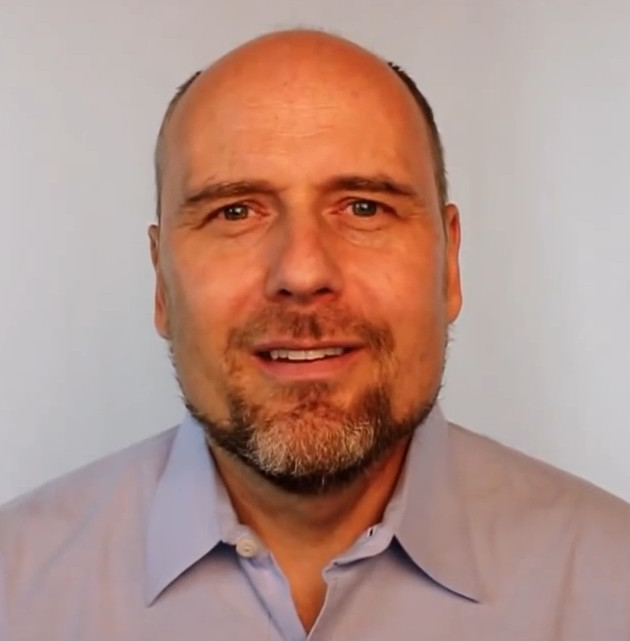
- Molyneux in 2014
- Born: Stefan Basil Molyneux; September 24, 1966 (age 60); Athlone, Ireland
- Education: York University (attended); National Theatre School (attended); McGill University (BA); University of Toronto (MA)
- Occupations: Podcaster, blogger, author, political commentator
- Years active: 2005–present
- Movement: Far-right; Alt-right; Identitarian movement; White nationalism; White supremacy; Anarcho-capitalism
- Spouse: Christina Papadopoulos
- Molyneux's voice On the negatives of government force.
- Website: freedomain.com

Stefan Basil Molyneux (/stəˈfæn ˈmɒlɪnjuː/; born September 24, 1966) is an Irish-born Canadian white nationalist vlogger and proponent of conspiracy theories, white supremacy, scientific racism, and the men's rights movement. He is the founder of the Freedomain Radio website. Multiple sources describe the Freedomain internet community as a cult, referring to the indoctrination techniques Molyneux has used as its leader.

He is described as a leading figure of the alt-right movement by Politico and The Washington Post, and as far-right by The New York Times. Tom Clements in The Independent describes him as "an alt-lite philosopher with a perverse fixation on race and IQ". Molyneux describes himself as a philosopher and an anarcho-capitalist. Molyneux previously worked in the software industry, wrote nine articles for libertarian Lew Rockwell's personal website, and has made appearances on Press TV, InfoWars, and RT.

== Background ==
Molyneux was born in Ireland and mostly raised in London before moving to Canada at age 11.

He attended Glendon College at York University in Toronto, acting at Theatre Glendon and being a member of the Debating Society. He then attended the National Theatre School of Canada in Montreal. In 1991, at age 25, Molyneux received a B.A. degree in history from McGill University. He received an M.A. degree in history from the University of Toronto in 1993.

== Career ==
In early 1995, Molyneux and his brother Hugh founded Caribou Systems Corporation, a Toronto-based provider of environmental database software. The company was sold in 2000.

Molyneux began a podcast called Freedomain Radio (FDR) in 2004. Over the next 13 years, he created over 1,000 podcasts and videos. Meanwhile, Molyneux wrote nine articles for the personal website of Lew Rockwell in 2005 and was a narrator in 2011 and 2012 for the Mises Institute think tank, which Rockwell founded. In 2010, Molyneux appeared on the Press TV program On the Edge hosted by Max Keiser, and first participated on Alex Jones' InfoWars show the following year. In that year and 2012, he made regular appearances on the RT program Adam vs. the Man, hosted by the libertarian Adam Kokesh.

In 2014, Molyneux, who has spoken out against copyright, used the DMCA to take down several videos from a YouTube channel that mocked Molyneux's actions and statements.

In July 2018, Molyneux and Canadian political activist Lauren Southern toured the Australian cities of Sydney and Melbourne. Molyneux disparaged pre-colonisation Australian Aboriginal culture, calling it "very violent", and downplayed massacres perpetrated against Aboriginals, saying that the European takeover of Australia had been less violent than other such takeovers, and that the settlers "were trying to stop infanticide and mass rape".

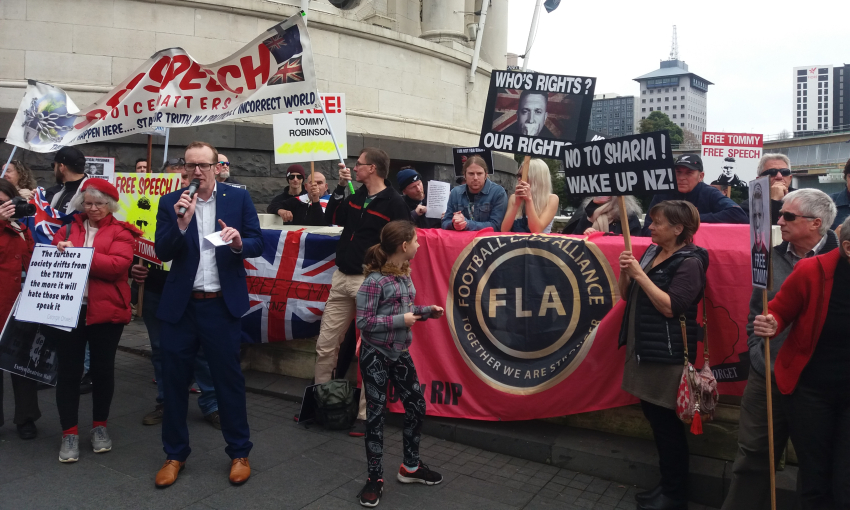
Libertarian politician Stephen Berry speaking at the free speech protest in defence of Southern and Molyneux, Auckland 2018

In July 2018, Molyneux applied for a travel visa to visit New Zealand for a speaking tour with Southern. Immigration Minister Iain Lees-Galloway described their views as "repugnant", but said they met immigration character requirements and cleared their entry. The pair had not secured a venue, as Auckland Council had cancelled their initial booking, citing health and safety concerns. The pair briefly cancelled and then resumed the tour over difficulties with the venue. The subsequent booking of a private venue was revoked by its owners. In retaliation, their venue was vandalised. The failure to find a venue was celebrated by around 1,000 protestors, who said the planned event had nothing to do with freedom of speech. Prime Minister Jacinda Ardern said New Zealand is "hostile" to the views of the speakers and, "I think you'll see from the reaction they've had from New Zealanders that their views are not those that are shared by this country, and I'm quite proud of that".

In August 2018, the Mayor of Auckland, Phil Goff, tweeted that Council venues should not be used to "stir up ethnic or religious tensions", and that "we've got no obligation at all" to provide a venue for hate speech. For agreeing with the cancellation, Green Party co-leader Marama Davidson received death threats.

Tāmaki Anti Fascist Action spokesperson Sina Brown-Davis said her group feared "dehumanising depictions of indigenous people" in New Zealand. Molyneux had said that Aboriginal and Torres Strait Islander people are at "the lowest rung of civilisation".

Green Party co-leader Marama Davidson added, "Aotearoa does not stand for your messages of racism, hatred and especially white supremacy". Justice Minister Andrew Little said the speakers "clearly have misled people" in trying to secure the venue. TV personality Te Hamua Nikora said the pair were against multiculturalism, unlike New Zealand. The minimum ticket price for the cancelled Auckland event was $99.

Molyneux has frequently hosted white supremacists on his podcast, such as Peter Brimelow (founder of the white-nationalist website VDARE), and Jared Taylor (founder of the white-nationalist magazine American Renaissance).

In November 2019, PayPal suspended Molyneux's account. He had previously received donations via the service. PayPal's actions came after activist group Sleeping Giants campaigned for him to be removed, citing Molyneux's bigoted attitudes including his promotion of antisemitic conspiracy theories concerning the media. In January 2020, Molyneux released a video in which he asked his followers for money and complained that he would not be able to find regular employment. Later that month, email marketing platform Mailchimp suspended Molyneux's account, which he used to send out his newsletter.

Molyneux's YouTube channel was banned on June 29, 2020, alongside white supremacists David Duke and Richard Spencer, for violating the YouTube policies against hate speech enacted in 2019. By the time it was closed, Molyneux's channel had 900,000 subscribers. Molyneux said it was a "systemic, coordinated effort" in which YouTube had "just suspended the largest philosophy conversation the world has ever known". Molyneux funds his efforts through listener support. Molyneux's Twitter account was permanently suspended on July 8, 2020, for violating Twitter's policies. By January 2023, after Elon Musk's acquisition of Twitter, his account was reinstated.

In December 2020, New Zealand's Royal Commission of Inquiry report revealed the perpetrator of the Christchurch mosque shootings had donated $138.89 AUD to Molyneux's podcast Freedomain Radio. The report also found that the terrorist's "thinking was affected by what was said in far-right online communities and other far-right material he found on the internet", some of which included Molyneux's content.

== Views ==
=== Promotion of white supremacy and conspiracy theories ===
Molyneux promotes white supremacist views and conspiracy theories. He is a proponent of the white genocide conspiracy theory, interviewing several South African advocates of the theory in his podcasts. In 2017, he stated that the film Star Wars: The Last Jedi has a concealed sub-text about the persecution of white people and predicted the "quasi-extinction" of whites "in the not so distant future". He further indicated that "Whites are not allowed to have a history to be proud of, not allowed to have in-group preferences" leading to "the end of a lineage. It's the end of a history. It is the end of culture". Molyneux has stated that "blacks are collectively less intelligent".

Molyneux describes himself as an anarcho-capitalist. According to the Southern Poverty Law Center (SPLC), Molyneux initially used the Freedomain Radio website "to amplify his views on anarcho-capitalist ideology, atheism, philosophy, anti-statism, pseudo-therapy and anti-feminism." The SPLC also stated that Molyneux's views become more politically extreme and racialized around 2013 or 2014 when his ideology shifted to include far-right and ethno-nationalist thinking. The SPLC describes him as an "internet commentator and alleged cult leader who amplifies 'scientific racism', eugenics and white supremacism to a massive new audience" and that "Stefan Molyneux operates within the racist so-called 'alt-right' and pro-Trump ranks". He gave his support to President Donald Trump and Marine Le Pen of the French National Rally, as well as the Dutch politician Geert Wilders, during their election campaigns in 2016 and 2017.

Molyneux has been described as a part of the "alt-right" by Politico, Metro, New York magazine, Vanity Fair, CBS News, and the Associated Press, and has been described as "one of the alt-right's biggest YouTube stars" by Washington Post columnist J.J. McCullough. Business Insider, CNN, The New York Times, and BuzzFeed News have characterized Molyneux as far-right. Data & Society, a research institute, described Molyneux as "a Canadian talk show host who promotes scientific racism".

According to The New York Times, Molyneux is fixated with "race realism". Molyneux has blamed "rap culture" for unarmed black men getting shot by police. In a possibly unbroadcast interview for OANN with Jack Posobiec, recorded in Warsaw, Poland, in November 2018, Molyneux said: "I've always been skeptical of the ideas of white nationalism ... However, I am an empiricist and I could not help but notice that I could have peaceful, free, easy, civilized and safe discussions in what is essentially an all-white country". An hour-long video on these themes was uploaded to YouTube.

The Independent of London describes Molyneux as a provocateur who "has been allowed to promote a racist, transphobic, misogynistic and Islamophobic agenda on various platforms but has started to see his revenue diminish", while including a tweet by Molyneux in which he asserts that he is not a "white nationalist" in response to being banned from a popular platform.

Molyneux has called global warming a "hoax".

=== Men's rights activism ===
Molyneux has described himself as a men's rights activist. He was a panelist at a 2014 Detroit conference held by the men's rights movement and manosphere organization, A Voice for Men. According to Jessica Roy of Time magazine, Molyneux argued that violence in the world is the result of how women treat their children, and that: "If we could just get people to be nice to their babies for five years straight, that would be it for war, drug abuse, addiction, promiscuity, sexually transmitted diseases, ... Almost all would be completely eliminated, because they all arise from dysfunctional early childhood experiences, which are all run by women". Molyneux believes feminism is a form of socialism, and has the aim of "reducing white Christian birth rates". He also believes that progressive gender politics are holding back young men.

In August 2017, on his YouTube channel, Molyneux interviewed James Damore, the Google employee who was fired after writing the "Google's Ideological Echo Chamber" memo opposing diversity measures. Molyneux agreed with Damore's memo, and said the main reason Damore had drawn heavy criticism was because he is a white man.

In August 2019, Molyneux advocated for lipstick to be banned in workplaces, saying "Do you know that female lipstick simulates sexual arousal? Can you imagine a man showing up for a business meeting with a giant artificial boner straining at his pants? Yet lipstick is perfectly acceptable in the business world."

=== Family-of-origin relationships ===
Molyneux refers to the family that people are born into as their "family-of-origin", or "FOO". He suggests that family-of-origin relationships may sometimes be detrimental, and individuals who are unsatisfied with their childhood relationships would benefit from severing such involuntary relationships as adults, or "deFOO". He views all adult relationships as being voluntary and discretionary rather than a duty. Molyneux has said:

Deep down I do not believe that there are any really good parents out there – the same way that I do not believe there were any really good doctors in the 10th century.

A disciplinary panel at the College of Psychologists of Ontario spoke critically of "deFOOing" after a professional investigation into Molyneux's wife, saying that by the standards of the College, it "may be appropriate to recommend family separation in cases of abuse" only after a suitable evaluation of patient history to "ascertain whether the advice [is] warranted in the circumstances". According to a 2008 article in The Guardian, both Molyneux and his wife have dissociated from their biological families.

Molyneux and "deFOOing" were subjects of an investigative documentary by Channel 5 in the United Kingdom, which aired on August 20, 2015. The same subjects were also featured on the February 18, 2016, episode of the documentary series Dark Net. The episode calls Freedomain Radio a cult.

== Reception ==
American libertarian philosopher David Gordon wrote of Molyneux's 2007 book Universally Preferable Behavior: A Rational Proof for Secular Ethics that, "Because of his facile intelligence, he thinks that he has a talent for philosophical argument and need not undertake the hard labor of learning how such arguments are constructed. Unfortunately for him and his book, he is mistaken" and "He fails, and fails miserably. His arguments are often preposterously bad."

=== Cult accusations ===
According to Steven Hassan, a mental health counselor with experience on cults, "Partly what's going on with the people on the Internet who are indoctrinated, they spend lots of hours on the computer. Videos can have them up all night for several nights in a row. Molyneux knows how to talk like he knows what he's talking about, despite very little academic research. He cites this and cites that, and presents it as the whole truth. It dismantles people's sense of self and replaces it with his sense of confidence about how to fix the world".

In 2009, Tu Thanh Ha wrote that Molyneux was called the leader of a "therapy cult" after Tom Bell, a Freedomain Radio community member, severed contact with his family. The Times of London reported that Bell, a teenager at the time, left a note stating he no longer wanted contact with his parents and siblings and left home referring to Molyneux's concept of "deFOOing", in which "FOO" stands for "family of origin".

It was reported, by Molyneux's estimation, that of the estimated 50,000 users of the website, about 20 (0.04%) FDR members had disassociated from their families-of-origin, and that many parents chose not to speak to the media in an effort to avoid alienating their children further. The British Cult Information Centre (CIC) has described Freedomain Radio as a cult. A representative of the CIC said they were following FDR, and said that one sign of cults was that they cut people off from their families. Molyneux responded by saying, "If I advised a wife to leave an abusive husband, there would not be articles about how I am a cult leader".

== Personal life ==
Molyneux resides in Mississauga, Ontario, Canada. His wife, Christina Papadopoulos, is a psychological associate.

== See also ==
- Anti-feminism
- Carl Benjamin
- Paleolibertarianism
- Political podcast
