= PeerTube =

Decentralised video hosting network

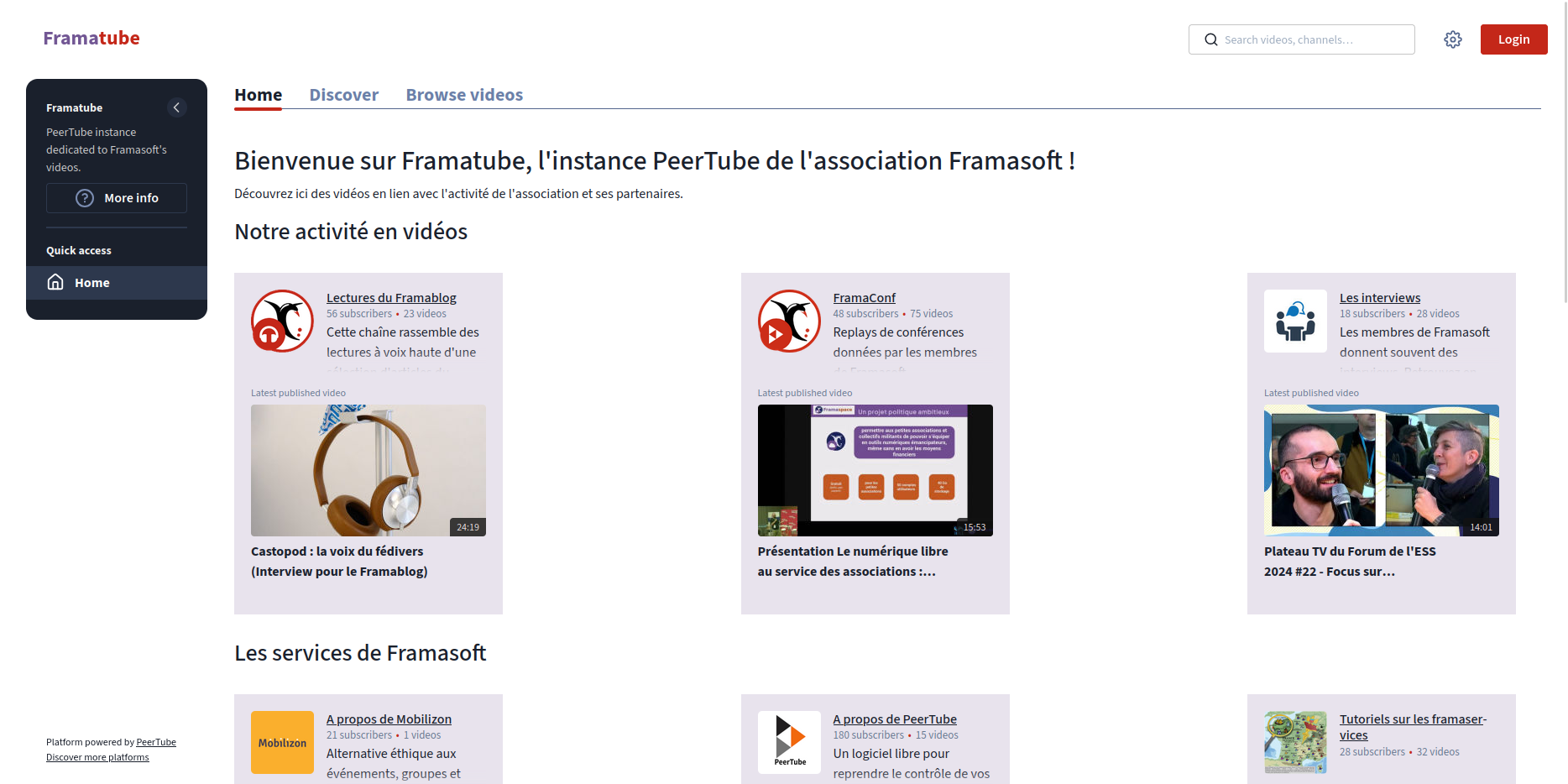
- Typical landing page for a PeerTube instance, showing Peertube’s home page
- Developer: Framasoft
- Release: 11 October 2018; 8 years ago
- Stable release: 8.3.1 / 28 September 2026; 20 days ago
- Written in: TypeScript, HTML, CSS, SQL
- Operating system: Unix-like
- Platform: Web
- Size: 2.49 MB (tar.xz), 30.70 MB (zip)
- Available in: 28 languages
- License: AGPLv3+
- Website: joinpeertube.org
- Repository: github.com/Chocobozzz/PeerTube

PeerTube is a free and open-source, decentralized, ActivityPub federated video platform. It can use peer-to-peer technology to reduce load on individual servers when videos get popular.

Started in 2017 by a programmer known as Chocobozzz, development of PeerTube is now supported by the French non-profit Framasoft. The aim is to provide an alternative to centralized platforms such as YouTube, Vimeo, and Dailymotion.

As an ActivityPub platform, PeerTube is part of the federated network known as the Fediverse.

== Operation ==
Each PeerTube instance provides a website to browse and watch videos, and is by default independent from others in terms of appearance, features and rules.

Several instances, with common rules (e.g. allowing for similar content, requiring registration) can form federations, where they follow each other's videos, even though every video is stored only by the instance that published it. Federations are independent from each other and asymmetrical: one instance can follow another to display their videos without them having to do the same. Instances' administrators can each choose to mirror individual videos or whole friend instances, creating an incentive to build communities of shared bandwidth.

Videos are made available via HTTP to download, but playback favors a peer-to-peer playback using HLS and WebRTC P2P (not to be confused with WebTorrent, which Peertube also previously supported but discontinued beginning with version 6). Users connected to the platform act as relay points that send pieces of video to other users, lessening the data transfer between each user and the server and thus allowing smaller hardware to operate at a lower cost.

== Origins and history ==
Sepia, PeerTube's mascot

PeerTube was created by a web developer known as Chocobozzz as a peer-to-peer alternative to YouTube, initially utilizing the WebTorrent protocol to share videos. He was contacted in 2017 by Framasoft, which had a campaign called Contributopia, the goal of which is to create alternatives to centralized platforms. In order to support him and his work, notably on improving the design and usability, Framasoft hired the developer.

In 2018, Framasoft launched a crowdfunding on KissKissBankBank which raised €53,100 – more than double the initial goal of €20,000.

The first beta of PeerTube was released in March 2018 and the first stable version in October 2018. In June 2018, only a few months after the first beta, 113 instances were publicly available on the web that together hosted more than 10,000 videos.

In June 2018, as a result of its videos disappearing amid changes regarding the monetization of YouTube channels, the Blender Foundation began experimenting with hosting a PeerTube instance to distribute copies of the foundation's videos.

In May 2020, Framasoft published a roadmap of the software for the later half of the year and created a fundraising campaign requiring €60,000 for aiding the development. Five months later (in October 2020), PeerTube announced that they reached their fundraising goal of €60,000 after a €10,000 donation from Debian. Throughout the later half of 2020, PeerTube added features such as global search, improved playlists, and more moderation tools.

At the end of 2020, a meta-search engine called Sepia Search was launched by Framasoft, allowing a global search on all PeerTube instances at once. As of 2021, Sepia Search covered close to 800 instances. Sepia Search defines an open interface between PeerTube instances and search indexes, which other search engines can implement.

In January 2021, Framasoft announced the release of PeerTube v3.0 with the help of a fundraising campaign. The release had peer-to-peer live streaming as its major feature.

In April 2022, the European Data Protection Supervisor (EDPS) launched a pilot ActivityPub video platform called EU Video for the EU institutions, bodies and agencies, based on PeerTube. The pilot project ended in May 2024, without an official continuation.

Official Android and iOS mobile apps were released that provide the ability to play content from PeerTube instances. The Android app, available via F-Droid and Google Play, allows for access from all or a limited number of instances, respectively. The iOS app, available via the Apple App Store, provides content from a narrow list of selected instances.

== Technology ==
Older versions of PeerTube offered both HLS over WebRTC-P2P (often referred to as "HLS with P2P") and WebTorrent (BitTorrent re-implemented on top of WebRTC) technology; release 6.0.0 removed WebTorrent support. With WebTorrent, each server hosted a torrent tracker and each web browser viewing a video also shares it.

HLS consumed by a browser viewer is usually implemented using "hls.js" and does not have P2P functionality, but the PeerTube project extended it with a custom loader that simultaneously downloads video chunks from the web server as well as from other viewers via WebRTC. This allows for spreading the load and bandwidth across the server and the clients using P2P technology.

The system works via a federation of instances run by independent entities. Each PeerTube server can host any number of videos by itself, and can additionally federate with other servers to let users watch their videos in the same user interface. This federation permits collectively hosting a large number of videos in a unified platform, without having to build an infrastructure comparable to that of the web giants. Each server is operated by and stays under the sole administration of a distinct entity.

PeerTube uses the ActivityPub protocol in order to allow decentralization and compatibility with other fediverse services, which can prevent vendor lock-in and makes it more resilient against censorship.

The software relies on the PostgreSQL DBMS.

Unofficial PeerTube video playback integrations exist for popular platforms like the community app and website Reddit and the app Kodi.

== See also ==
- Comparison of BitTorrent clients
- Cooperative storage cloud
- Decentralized computing
- List of online video platforms
- Peer-to-peer web hosting
