= Formations House =

UK firm that registered and operated companies

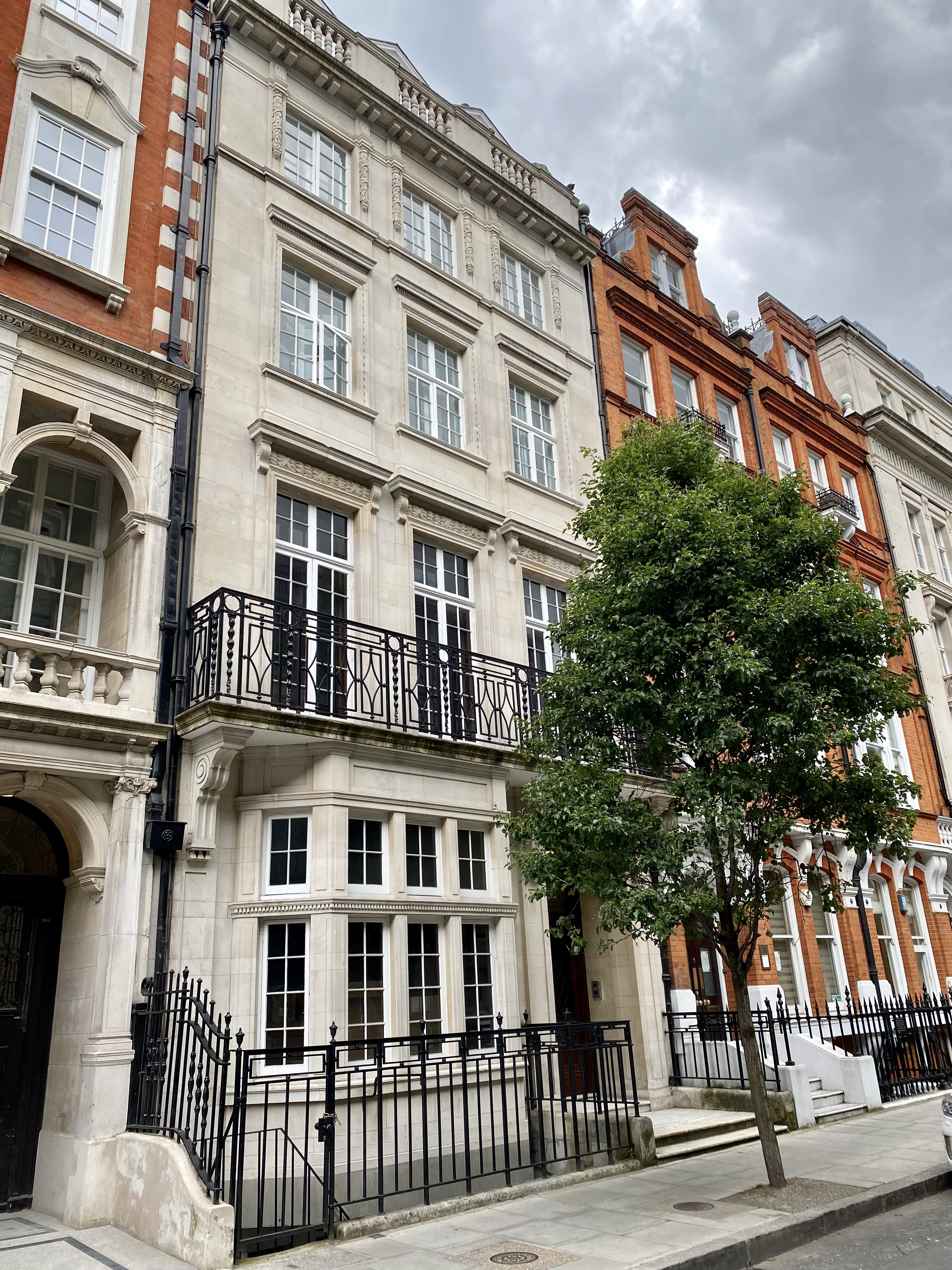
29 Harley Street in 2024

Formations House (now The London Office) is a "company mill" which registered and operated companies for clients included organized crime groups, state-owned oil companies, and fraudulent banks.

The company was founded in 2001 and registered at 29 Harley Street and promised to let clients run businesses "in Central London at a prestigious Harley Street business address". The company formed more than 450,000 corporate entities in Britain, Gambia, Hong Kong, the Seychelles, the British Virgin Islands, Ireland, the US state of Delaware, Panama, Gibraltar, Jersey, the Isle of Man, Belize and Mauritius.

== #29 Leaks ==
In December 2019, Distributed Denial of Secrets (DDoSecrets) published "#29 Leaks" in partnership with the Organized Crime and Corruption Reporting Project and more than 20 outlets in 18 countries.

The 450 gigabyte leak included emails, documents, faxes, and recordings of phone calls. Investigations revealed the firm ran a web of companies registered in Hong Kong, Cyprus, the British Virgin Islands and Pakistan, helped clients avoid anti–money laundering rules and had created banks in The Gambia in an attempt to create a tax haven. According to The Times, there was no evidence that Formations House did anything illegal but their investigation highlighted worrying vulnerabilities in the UK's defences against money laundering".

The release was compared to both the International Consortium of Investigative Journalists (ICIJ) Panama Papers and the Paradise Papers. Belgian tax authorities initiated an investigation based on data from this leak and from the Cayman National Bank and Trust leak published by DDoSecrets the prior month. Politicians in Sweden and the UK, including anti-corruption chief John Penrose said the leak showed the need for reforms on company creation and registration.

== See also ==
- Cyprus Confidential
- Mauritius Leaks
- Panama Papers
- Paradise Papers
- Suisse Secrets
- Swiss Leaks
