= Emma Best =

Emma Best may refer to:

- Emma Best (journalist), American journalist
- Emma Best (politician) (born 1991), British politician
