= List of material published by WikiLeaks =

Since 2006, the document archive website WikiLeaks has published anonymous submissions of documents that are typically unavailable to the general public.

== 2006–2008 ==
=== Apparent Somali assassination order ===
WikiLeaks posted its first document in December 2006, a decision to assassinate government officials, signed by Sheikh Hassan Dahir Aweys. The New Yorker has reported that

[Julian] Assange and the others were uncertain of its authenticity, but they thought that readers, using Wikipedia-like features of the site, would help analyze it. They published the decision with a lengthy commentary, which asked, "Is it a bold manifesto by a flamboyant Islamic militant with links to Bin Laden? Or is it a clever smear by US intelligence, designed to discredit the Union, fracture Somali alliances and manipulate China?" ... The document's authenticity was never determined, and news about WikiLeaks quickly superseded the leak itself.

=== Daniel arap Moi family corruption ===
On 31 August 2007, The Guardian featured on its front page a story about corruption by the family of the former Kenyan leader Daniel arap Moi. The newspaper stated that the source of the information was a report by Kroll commissioned by the Kenyan government which was sent to WikiLeaks. Corruption was a major issue in the election that followed, which was marred by violence. According to Assange, "1,300 people were eventually killed, and 350,000 were displaced. That was a result of our leak. On the other hand, the Kenyan people had a right to that information and 40,000 children a year die of malaria in Kenya. And many more die of money being pulled out of Kenya, and as a result of the Kenyan shilling being debased".

=== Camp Delta Standard Operating Procedures ===
A copy of Standard Operating Procedures for Camp Delta–the protocol of the U.S. Army at the Guantanamo Bay detention camp– was released on the WikiLeaks website on 7 November 2007. The document was written under the authority of Geoffrey D. Miller when he was the officer in charge of Joint Task Force Guantanamo. This leaked document, dated 28 March 2003, included instructions on how to psychologically manipulate and intimidate prisoners with the use of military dogs, as well as rules for dealing with hunger strikes. It was published on WikiLeaks on Wednesday 7 November 2007. The document, named "gitmo-sop.pdf", is also mirrored at The Guardian. Its release revealed some of the restrictions placed over detainees at the camp, including the designation of some prisoners as off-limits to the International Committee of the Red Cross (ICRC), something that the U.S. military had in the past repeatedly denied. In it, Miller specifies four levels of access the ICRC would be allowed to captives: 1) No Access; 2) Visual Access—ICRC can only look at a prisoner's physical condition; 3) Restricted Access—ICRC representatives can only ask short questions about the prisoner's health; and 4) Unrestricted Access. Wired Magazine reported that spokesmen from the Department of Defense declined to comment on the leak. The Guantánamo Bay Manual included procedures for transferring prisoners and methods of evading protocols of the Geneva convention.

The Associated Press reported that Army Lieutenant Colonel Ed Bush called the manual out-of-date. According to Lieutenant Colonel Bush, AP reports, dogs are no longer used, and the Red Cross is no longer denied access to any of the captives. On 3 December 2007, WikiLeaks released a copy of the 2004 edition of the manual, together with a detailed analysis of the changes.

=== Bank Julius Baer ===
In February 2008, the wikileaks.org domain name was taken offline after the Swiss Bank Julius Baer sued WikiLeaks and the wikileaks.org domain registrar, Dynadot, in a court in California, United States, and obtained a permanent injunction ordering the shutdown. WikiLeaks had hosted allegations of illegal activities at the bank's Cayman Islands branch. WikiLeaks' U.S. Registrar, Dynadot, complied with the order by removing its DNS entries. However, the website remained accessible via its numeric IP address, and online activists immediately mirrored WikiLeaks at dozens of alternative websites worldwide.

The same judge, Jeffrey White, who issued the injunction vacated it on 29 February 2008, citing First Amendment concerns and questions about legal jurisdiction. WikiLeaks was thus able to bring its site online again. The bank dropped the case on 5 March 2008. The judge also denied the bank's request for an order prohibiting the website's publication.

=== BNP membership list ===
After briefly appearing on a blog, the membership list of the far-right British National Party was posted to WikiLeaks on 18 November 2008. The name, address, age and occupation of many of the 13,500 members were given, including several police officers, two solicitors, four ministers of religion, at least one doctor, and a number of primary and secondary school teachers. In Britain, police officers are banned from joining or promoting the BNP, and at least one officer was dismissed for being a member. The BNP was known for going to considerable lengths to conceal the identities of members. On 19 November, BNP leader Nick Griffin stated that he knew the identity of the person who initially leaked the list on 17 November, describing him as a "hardliner" senior employee who left the party in 2007. On 20 October 2009, a list of BNP members from April 2009 was leaked. This list contained 11,811 members.

=== Killings by the Kenyan police ===
WikiLeaks publicised reports on extrajudicial executions by Kenyan police for one week starting 1 November 2008 on its home page. Two of the human rights investigators involved, Oscar Kamau Kingara and John Paul Oulu, who made major contributions to a Kenya National Commission on Human Rights (KNCHR) report that was redistributed by WikiLeaks, The Cry of Blood – Report on Extra-Judicial Killings and Disappearances, were assassinated several months later, on 5 March 2009. WikiLeaks called for information on the assassination. In 2009, Amnesty International UK gave WikiLeaks and Julian Assange an award for the distribution of the KNCHR's The Cry of Blood report.

=== Northern Rock Bank ===
In 2007, the bank Northern Rock suffered a crisis and was propped up by an emergency loan by the Bank of England. During the crisis, a judge banned the media from publishing a sales prospectus which Northern Rock had issued. WikiLeaks hosted a copy of the prospectus and letters from lawyers Schillings warning against the publication of the prospectus.

=== Sarah Palin's Yahoo! email account contents ===
In September 2008, during the 2008 United States presidential election campaigns, the contents of a Yahoo! account belonging to Sarah Palin (the running mate of Republican presidential nominee John McCain) were posted on WikiLeaks after being hacked into by members of Anonymous. It has been alleged by Wired that contents of the mailbox indicate that she used the private Yahoo! account to send work-related messages, in violation of public record laws. The hacking of the account was widely reported in mainstream news outlets. Although WikiLeaks was able to conceal the hacker's identity, the source of the Palin emails was eventually publicly identified as David Kernell, a 20-year-old economics student at the University of Tennessee and the son of Democratic Tennessee State Representative Mike Kernell from Memphis, whose email address (as listed on various social networking sites) was linked to the hacker's identity on Anonymous. Kernell attempted to conceal his identity by using the anonymous proxy service ctunnel.com, but, because of the illegal nature of the access, ctunnel website administrator Gabriel Ramuglia assisted the FBI in tracking down the source of the hack.

=== Scientology ===
On 24 March 2008, WikiLeaks published what they referred to as "the collected secret 'bibles' of Scientology". On 7 April 2008, they reported receiving a letter (dated 27 March) from the Religious Technology Center claiming ownership of the several documents pertaining to OT Levels within the Church of Scientology. These same documents were at the center of a 1994 scandal. The email stated:

The Advanced Technology materials are unpublished, copyrighted works. Please be advised that your customer's action in this regard violates United States copyright law. Accordingly, we ask for your help in removing these works immediately from your service.

— Moxon & Kobrin

The letter continued on to request the release of the logs of the uploader, which would remove their anonymity. WikiLeaks responded with a statement released on Wikinews stating: "in response to the attempted suppression, WikiLeaks will release several thousand additional pages of Scientology material next week", and did so.

=== Tibetan dissent in China ===
On 24 March 2008, WikiLeaks made 35 uncensored videos of civil unrest in Tibet available for viewing, to get around official Chinese censorship during the worst of the unrest.

== 2009 ==
=== 2008 Peru oil scandal ===
On 28 January 2009, WikiLeaks released 86 telephone intercept recordings of Peruvian politicians and businessmen involved in the "Petrogate" oil scandal.

=== Congressional Research Service reports ===
On 7 February 2009, WikiLeaks released 6,780 Congressional Research Service reports.

The release was included in the second superseding indictment of Julian Assange. The indictment alleged that "in 2009, for instance, Assange told the Hacking At Random conference that WikiLeaks had obtained nonpublic documents from the Congressional Research Service by exploiting “a small vulnerability” inside the document distribution system of the United States Congress" while trying "to encourage others to hack to obtain information for WikiLeaks."

=== WikiLeaks confidential donor information ===
In February 2009, WikiLeaks published an email containing WikiLeaks own confidential donor information. The email had been submitted to the WikiLeaks platform by a leaker who commented "WikiLeaks leaks its own donors, aww irony. BCC next time kthx". A WikiLeaks administrator had sent the email to previous donors without blind carbon copy. WikiLeaks said the source had submitted the email to its platform "possibly to test the project's principles of complete impartiality when dealing with whistleblowers." Jay Lim of WikiLeaks said the release of the list of previous donors was an admin error unrelated to source protection.

=== NATO's Master Narrative for Afghanistan ===
In February, WikiLeaks cracked the encryption to and published NATO's Master Narrative for Afghanistan and three other classified or restricted NATO documents on the Pentagon Central Command (CENTCOM) site.

=== Contributors to Coleman campaign ===
In March 2009, WikiLeaks published a list of contributors to the Norm Coleman senatorial campaign.

=== Barclays Bank tax avoidance ===
In March 2009, documents concerning complex arrangements made by Barclays Bank to avoid paying government taxes, appeared on Wikileaks. The documents had been ordered to be removed from the website of The Guardian. In an editorial on the issue, The Guardian pointed out that, due to the mismatch of resources, tax collectors (HMRC) now have to rely on websites such as Wikileaks to obtain such documents.

=== Internet censorship lists ===
WikiLeaks has published the lists of forbidden or illegal web addresses for several countries.

On 19 March 2009, WikiLeaks published what was alleged to be the Australian Communications and Media Authority's blacklist of sites to be banned under Australia's proposed laws on Internet censorship. Reactions to the publication of the list by the Australian media and politicians were varied. Particular note was made by journalistic outlets of the type of websites on the list; while the Internet censorship scheme submitted by the Australian Labor Party in 2008 was proposed with the stated intention of preventing access to child pornography and sites related to terrorism, the list leaked on WikiLeaks contains a number of sites unrelated to sex crimes involving minors. When questioned about the leak, Stephen Conroy, the Minister for Broadband, Communications and the Digital Economy in Australia's Rudd Labor Government, responded by claiming that the list was not the actual list, yet threatening to prosecute anyone involved in distributing it. On 20 March 2009, WikiLeaks published an updated list, dated 18 March 2009; it more closely matches the claimed size of the ACMA blacklist, and contains two pages that have been independently confirmed as blacklisted by ACMA.

WikiLeaks also contains details of Internet censorship in Thailand, including lists of censored sites dating back to May 2006.

Wikileaks published a list of web sites blacklisted by Denmark.

=== Bilderberg Group meeting reports ===
Since May 2009, WikiLeaks has republished reports of several meetings of the Bilderberg Group. It includes the group's history and meeting reports from the years 1955, 1956, 1957, 1958, 1960, 1962, 1963 and 1980.

=== Nuclear accident in Iran ===
On 16 July 2009, Iranian news agencies reported that the head of Iran's atomic energy organisation Gholam Reza Aghazadeh had abruptly resigned for unknown reasons after twelve years in office. Shortly afterwards WikiLeaks released a report disclosing a "serious nuclear accident" at the Iranian Natanz nuclear facility in 2009. The Federation of American Scientists (FAS) released statistics that say the number of enriched centrifuges operational in Iran mysteriously declined from about 4,700 to about 3,900 beginning around the time the nuclear incident WikiLeaks mentioned would have occurred.

According to media reports the accident may have been the direct result of a cyberattack at Iran's nuclear program, carried out with the Stuxnet computer worm.

=== Toxic dumping in Africa: The Minton report ===
In September 2006, commodities giant Trafigura commissioned an internal report about a toxic dumping incident in the Ivory Coast, which (according to the United Nations) affected 108,000 people. The document, called the Minton Report, names various harmful chemicals "likely to be present" in the waste and notes that some of them "may cause harm at some distance". The report states that potential health effects include "burns to the skin, eyes and lungs, vomiting, diarrhea, loss of consciousness and death", and suggests that the high number of reported casualties is "consistent with there having been a significant release of hydrogen sulphide gas".

On 11 September 2009, Trafigura's lawyers, Carter-Ruck, obtained a secret "super-injunction" against The Guardian, banning that newspaper from publishing the contents of the document. Trafigura also threatened a number of other media organisations with legal action if they published the report's contents, including the Norwegian Broadcasting Corporation and The Chemical Engineer magazine. On 14 September 2009, WikiLeaks posted the report.

On 12 October, Carter-Ruck warned The Guardian against mentioning the content of a parliamentary question that was due to be asked about the report. Instead, the paper published an article stating that they were unable to report on an unspecified question and claiming that the situation appeared to "call into question privileges guaranteeing free speech established under the 1689 Bill of Rights". The suppressed details rapidly circulated via the internet and Twitter and, amid uproar, Carter-Ruck agreed the next day to the modification of the injunction before it was challenged in court, permitting The Guardian to reveal the existence of the question and the injunction. The injunction was lifted on 16 October.

=== Kaupthing Bank ===
WikiLeaks made available an internal document from Kaupthing Bank from just prior to the collapse of Iceland's banking sector, which led to the 2008–2012 Icelandic financial crisis. The document shows that suspiciously large sums of money were loaned to various owners of the bank, and large debts written off. Kaupthing's lawyers have threatened WikiLeaks with legal action, citing banking privacy laws. The leak has caused an uproar in Iceland. Criminal charges relating to the multibillion-euro loans to Exista and other major shareholders are being investigated. The bank is seeking to recover loans taken out by former bank employees before its collapse.

=== Joint Services Protocol 440 ===
In October 2009, Joint Services Protocol 440, a 2,400-page restricted document written in 2001 by the British Ministry of Defence was leaked. It contained instructions for the security services on how to avoid leaks of information by hackers, journalists, and foreign spies.

=== Climategate emails ===
In November 2009, controversial documents, including e-mail correspondence between climate scientists, were released (allegedly after being illegally obtained) from the University of East Anglia's (UEA) Climatic Research Unit (CRU). According to the university, the emails and documents were obtained through a server hacking; one prominent host of the full 120 MB archive was WikiLeaks, although the information was not originally leaked to them.

=== 9/11 pager messages ===
On 25 November 2009, WikiLeaks released 570,000 intercepts of pager messages sent on the day of the September 11 attacks. Chelsea Manning commented that she recognized them as being from an NSA database. Among the released messages are communications between Pentagon officials and New York City Police Department.

== 2010 ==
=== U.S. Intelligence report on WikiLeaks ===
A formerly secret DOD document on OIF, published by WikiLeaks

On 15 March 2010, WikiLeaks released a secret 32-page U.S. Department of Defense Counterintelligence Analysis Report from March 2008. The document described some prominent reports leaked on the website. These related to U.S. security interests, and described potential methods of marginalising the organisation. WikiLeaks editor Julian Assange said that some details in the Army report were inaccurate and its recommendations flawed, and also that the concerns of the U.S. Army raised by the report were hypothetical.

The report discussed deterring potential whistleblowers via termination of employment and criminal prosecution of any existing or former insiders, leakers or whistleblowers. Reasons for the report include notable leaks such as U.S. equipment expenditure, human rights violations in Guantanamo Bay, and the battle over the Iraqi town of Fallujah.

=== Baghdad airstrike video ===
On 5 April 2010, WikiLeaks released classified U.S. military footage from a series of attacks on 12 July 2007 in Baghdad by a U.S. helicopter that killed 12–18 people, including two Reuters news staff, Saeed Chmagh and Namir Noor-Eldeen. The attack also wounded others including two children who were in a van that was fired on when it came to collect the wounded men. The video, which WikiLeaks titled Collateral Murder, showed the crew firing on a group of people and killing several of them, and then laughing at some of the casualties, all of whom were civilians. After wounding the two children one pilot says "Well, it’s their fault for bringing their kids into a battle". An anonymous U.S. military official confirmed the authenticity of the footage, which provoked global discussion on the legality and morality of the attacks.

According to some media reports, the Reuters news staff were in the company of armed men and the pilots may have thought Chmagh and Noor-Eldeen were carrying weapons which was actually camera equipment. The military conducted an investigation into the incident and found there were two rocket propelled grenade launchers and one AK-47 among the dead.

=== Afghan War Diary ===
On 25 July 2010, WikiLeaks released to The Guardian, The New York Times, and Der Spiegel over 92,000 documents related to the war in Afghanistan between 2004 and the end of 2009. The documents detail individual incidents including friendly fire and civilian casualties. The scale of the leak was described by Julian Assange as comparable to that of the Pentagon Papers in the 1970s. The documents were released to the public on 25 July 2010. On 29 July 2010 WikiLeaks added a 1.4 GB "insurance file" to the Afghan War Diary page, whose decryption details some speculation would be released if WikiLeaks or Assange were harmed.

About 15,000 of the 92,000 documents have not yet been released on WikiLeaks, as the group is currently reviewing the documents to remove some of the sources of the information. Speaking to a group in London in August 2010, Assange said that the group will "absolutely" release the remaining documents. He stated that WikiLeaks has requested help from the Pentagon and human-rights groups to help redact the names, but has not received any assistance. He also stated that WikiLeaks is "not obligated to protect other people's sources...unless it is from unjust retribution."

According to a report on the Daily Beast website, the Obama administration has asked Britain, Germany and Australia among others to consider bringing criminal charges against Assange for the Afghan war leaks and to help limit Assange's travels across international borders. In the United States, a joint investigation by the Army and the Federal Bureau of Investigation may try to prosecute "Mr. Assange and others involved on grounds they encouraged the theft of government property".

The Australia Defence Association (ADA) stated that WikiLeaks' Julian Assange "could have committed a serious criminal offence in helping an enemy of the Australian Defence Force (ADF)." Neil James, the executive director of ADA, states: "Put bluntly, Wikileaks is not authorised in international or Australian law, nor equipped morally or operationally, to judge whether open publication of such material risks the safety, security, morale and legitimate objectives of Australian and allied troops fighting in a UN-endorsed military operation."

WikiLeaks' leaking of classified U.S. intelligence has been described by commentator of The Wall Street Journal as having "endangered the lives of Afghan informants" and "the dozens of Afghan civilians named in the document dump as U.S. military informants. Their lives, as well as those of their entire families, are now at terrible risk of Taliban reprisal." When interviewed, Assange stated that WikiLeaks has withheld some 15,000 documents that identify informants to avoid putting their lives at risk. Specifically, Voice of America reported in August 2010 that Assange, responding to such criticisms, stated that the 15,000 still held documents are being reviewed "line by line," and that the names of "innocent parties who are under reasonable threat" will be removed. Greg Gutfeld of Fox News described the leaking as "WikiLeaks' Crusade Against the U.S. Military." John Pilger has reported that prior to the release of the Afghan War Diaries in July, WikiLeaks contacted the White House in writing, asking that it identify names that might draw reprisals, but received no response.

=== Love Parade documents ===
Following the Love Parade stampede in Duisburg, Germany on 24 July 2010, the local news blog Xtranews published internal documents of the city administration regarding Love Parade planning and actions by the authorities. The city government reacted by acquiring a court order on 16 August forcing Xtranews to remove the documents from its blog. Two days later, however, after the documents had surfaced on other websites as well, the government stated that it would not conduct any further legal actions against the publication of the documents. On 20 August WikiLeaks released a publication titled Loveparade 2010 Duisburg planning documents, 2007–2010, which comprised 43 internal documents regarding the Love Parade 2010.

=== Iraq War logs ===
In October 2010, it was reported that WikiLeaks was planning to release up to 400,000 documents relating to the Iraq War. Julian Assange initially denied the reports, stating: "WikiLeaks does not speak about upcoming releases dates, indeed, with very rare exceptions we do not communicate any specific information about upcoming releases, since that simply provides fodder for abusive organizations to get their spin machines ready." The Guardian reported on 21 October 2010 that it had received almost 400,000 Iraq war documents from WikiLeaks. On 22 October 2010, Al Jazeera was the first to release analyses of the leak, dubbed The War Logs. WikiLeaks posted a tweet that "Al Jazeera have broken our embargo by 30 minutes. We release everyone from their Iraq War Logs embargoes." This prompted other news organisations to release their articles based on the source material. The release of the documents coincided with a return of the main wikileaks.org website, which had been offering no content since 30 September 2010.

The BBC quoted The Pentagon referring to the Iraq War Logs as "the largest leak of classified documents in its history." Media coverage of the leaked documents focused on claims that the U.S. government had ignored reports of torture by the Iraqi authorities after the 2003 war.

=== State Department diplomatic cables release ===
On 22 November 2010, Wikileaks tweeted that its next release would be "7x the size of the Iraq War Logs." U.S. authorities and the media speculated that they contained diplomatic cables. Prior to the expected leak, the government of the United Kingdom (UK) sent a DA-Notice to UK newspapers, which requests advance notice from the newspapers regarding the expected publication. According to Index on Censorship, "there is no obligation on media to comply". "Newspaper editors would speak to [the] Defence, Press and Broadcasting Advisory Committee prior to publication." The Pakistani newspaper Dawn stated that the U.S. newspapers The New York Times and The Washington Post were expected to publish parts of the diplomatic cables on Sunday 28 November, including 94 Pakistan-related documents.

== 2011 ==
=== Guantanamo Bay files ===
On 24 April 2011 WikiLeaks began a month-long release of 779 US Department of Defense documents about detainees at the Guantanamo Bay detention camp.

=== The Spy Files ===
On 1 December 2011 WikiLeaks started to release the Spy Files. The files were a collection of brochures, manuals, catalogues and videos from over 160 intelligence contractors like Hacking Team, who advertised a remote "stealth system for attacking, infecting and monitoring computers and smartphones." The files revealed a trade show nicknamed the Wiretappers’ Ball, where hundreds of vendors sold “lawful intercept” technology to thousands of buyers from dozens of countries.

== 2012 ==
On 22 February 2012, WikiLeaks released its second insurance file via BitTorrent. The file is named "wikileaks-insurance-20120222.tar.bz2.aes" and about 65 GB in size.

=== The Global Intelligence Files ===
On 27 February 2012, WikiLeaks began to publish what it called "The Global Intelligence Files", more than 5,000,000 e-mails from Stratfor dating from July 2004 to late December 2011. It was said to show how a private intelligence agency operates and how it targets individuals for their corporate and government clients. Some emails and attachments released by WikiLeaks had malware.

=== Syria Files ===
On 5 July 2012, WikiLeaks began publishing the Syria Files, more than two million emails from Syrian political figures, ministries and associated companies, dating from August 2006 to March 2012.

== 2013 ==
=== Public Library of US Diplomacy (PlusD) ===
In April 2013, WikiLeaks published a searchable database of 1.7 million U.S. diplomatic and intelligence reports, including the Kissinger cables. Julian Assange said the records "highlighted the 'vast range and scope' of US influence around the world". The cables were declassified in 2006 and transferred from the U.S. Department of State to the U.S. National Archives and Records Administration. The records were largely ignored until Assange published a copy of the archive in a searchable form while residing in the Ecuadorian embassy under political asylum. In a cable dated 27 February 1976, U.S. ambassador to Australia, James Hargrove reported on a conversation he had with Australian opposition leader Gough Whitlam, in which Whitlam gave Hargrave details about an attempt to obtain funding for the ALP from the Iraqi Ba'ath Party. The archive revealed that future Australian Prime Minister Bob Hawke was an important informant to the US during the 1970s.

=== Spy Files 3 ===
On 4 September 2013, WikiLeaks released 'Spy Files #3' – 249 documents from 92 global intelligence contractors. The files showed spyware exported to countries across the world, including to dictators.

=== Draft Trans-Pacific Partnership Agreement IP Charter ===
On 13 November 2013, WikiLeaks published the draft text for the Trans-Pacific Partnership Agreement Intellectual Property charter. The leaked chapter could have created stricter laws for digital copyrights and freedom of speech. Critics of the draft called it a "Christmas wish-list for major corporations." Matthew Rimmer, an intellectual property law expert, told The Sydney Morning Herald that "Hollywood, the music industry, big IT" and pharmaceutical companies would all be happy with it.

== 2014 ==
=== Trade in Services Agreement chapter draft ===
WikiLeaks published a secret draft of the Financial Services Annex of the Trade in Services Agreement in June 2014. On its website, the organisation provided an analysis of the leaked document. TISA, an international trade deal aimed at market liberalisation, covers 50 countries and 68% of the global services industry. The agreement's negotiations have been criticised for a lack of transparency.

=== Australian bribery case suppression order ===
On 29 July 2014, WikiLeaks released a secret gagging order issued by the Supreme Court of Victoria that forbid the Australian press from coverage of a multimillion-dollar bribery investigation involving the nation's central bank and several international leaders. Indonesian, Vietnamese, Malaysian and Australian government officials were named in the order, which was suppressed to "prevent damage to Australia's international relations that may be caused by the publication of material that may damage the reputations of specified individuals who are not the subject of charges in these proceedings."

Public criticism of the suppression order followed the leak. Human Rights Watch General Counsel Dinah PoKempner, said "Secret law is often unaccountable and inadequately justified. The government has some explaining to do as to why it sought such an extraordinary order, and the court should reconsider the need for it now that its action has come to light." At a media conference, Indonesian president Susilo Bambang Yudhoyono condemned the gagging order, calling for an open and transparent investigation.

== 2015 ==
=== TPP Investment Chapter ===
On 25 March 2015 WikiLeaks released the "Investment Chapter" from the secret negotiations of the TPP (Trans-Pacific Partnership) agreement, one of the most controversial parts of the deal. Before the leak, TPP provisions had been kept secret in order to allow negotiations to run smoothly. TPP opponents and transparency proponents argued secrecy lets governments push things through that constituents wouldn't like.

=== Sony archives ===
On 16 April 2015, WikiLeaks published a searchable version of the Sony Archives which were originally obtained in November 2014 by the hacker group "Guardians of Peace". The leak contained 30,287 documents from Sony Pictures Entertainment (SPE) and 173,132 emails between more than 2,200 SPE email addresses. SPE is a US subsidiary of the Japanese multinational technology and media corporation Sony, that handles film and TV production and distribution operations.

=== Trident Nuclear Weapons System ===
Whistle blower, Royal Navy Able Seaman William McNeilly exposed serious security issues relate to the UK's nuclear weapons system. McNeilly's 18-page report alleged serious lapses in security, including floods and fires, security passes not being checked, and the risk of infiltration. The Navy rejected his allegations, but said they would investigate them. After the leak, McNeilly evaded capture before handing himself in.

=== The Saudi Cables ===
In June 2015 Wikileaks began publishing confidential and secret Saudi Arabian government documents. TIME and others reported speculated that a group of hackers called the Yemen Cyber Army were WikiLeaks' source, and Al-Jazeera said there was a possible connection in the WikiLeaks press release. Experts including Recorded Future believed the Yemen Cyber Army was an Iranian front.

Cables from early 2013 indicate that the British government under David Cameron may have traded votes with Saudi Arabia to support each other's election to the United Nations Human Rights Council (UNHRC) for the period 2014–2016. Both Britain and Saudi Arabia joined the UNHRC in the election held in 2013. UN Watch expressed concern at the report saying that UNHRC must be chosen based on upholding the highest standards of human rights.

Saudi Arabia didn't deny the documents were authentic, but appeared to respond to the release by warning its citizens against sharing "documents that might be faked". The release received some criticism for being an unredacted "info dump" that included at least 124 medical files of rape victims, mental health patients, and others. It also included personal, financial and identity records, including Hillary Clinton's passport information. Other files outed gay people. WikiLeaks responded to the media criticism with a series of tweets, calling it “recycled news” that was “not even worth a headline.”

=== NSA spying ===
On 23 June 2015, WikiLeaks published documents under the name of "Espionnage Élysée", which showed that NSA spied on the French government, including but not limited to then President Francois Hollande and his predecessors Nicolas Sarkozy and Jacques Chirac. On 29 June 2015, WikiLeaks published more NSA secret documents regarding France, detailing economic espionage by the NSA against French companies and associations. In July 2015, WikiLeaks published documents which showed that the NSA had tapped the telephones of many German federal ministries, including that of the Chancellor Angela Merkel, for years since the 1990s. On 4 July 2015, WikiLeaks published documents which showed that 29 Brazilian government numbers were selected for secret espionage by the NSA. Among the targets were then-President Dilma Rousseff, many assistants and advisors, her presidential jet and other key figures in the Brazilian government.

On 31 July 2015, WikiLeaks published secret intercepts and the related target list showing that the NSA spied on the Japanese government, including the Cabinet and Japanese companies such as Mitsubishi and Mitsui. The documents revealed that United States espionage against Japan concerned broad sections of communications about the US-Japan diplomatic relationship and Japan's position on climate change issues, other than an extensive monitoring of the Japanese economy.

=== John Brennan emails ===
On 21 October 2015 WikiLeaks published some of John O. Brennan's emails, including a draft security clearance application which contained personal information.

== 2016 ==
=== DNC email leak ===
On 22 July 2016, WikiLeaks released nearly 20,000 e-mails and over 8,000 attachments from the Democratic National Committee (DNC), the governing body of the U.S. Democratic Party. The publication prompted allegations that the DNC was biased in favour of Hillary Clinton presidential campaign and against Bernie Sanders's campaign, in apparent contradiction with the DNC leadership's publicly stated neutrality, as several DNC operatives openly derided Sanders's campaign and discussed ways to advance Hillary Clinton's nomination. Later publications included controversial DNC–Clinton agreements dated before the primary, regarding financial arrangements and control over policy and hiring decisions. The revelations prompted the resignation of DNC chair Debbie Wasserman Schultz before the 2016 Democratic National Convention. The Mueller investigation indicted 12 Russian intelligence officers for hacking and leaking the emails.

=== Podesta emails ===
On 7 October 2016, WikiLeaks started publishing emails from John Podesta, the chairman of Hillary Clinton's 2016 presidential campaign. The emails provided insight into the inner workings of Clinton's campaign. One of the emails contained 25 excerpts from Clinton's paid Wall Street speeches. Another leaked document included eighty pages of Clinton's Wall Street speeches. The material included emails showing that CNN contributor and interim chairwoman of the Democratic National Committee, Donna Brazile, shared questions with the Clinton campaign prior to debates during the DNC primaries. Brazile resigned from CNN in October 2016 due to the revelations. One of the emails released on 12 October 2016 included Podesta's iCloud account password. His iCloud account was reportedly hacked, and his Twitter account was briefly compromised. Some were emails that Barack Obama and Podesta exchanged in 2008.

The New York Times reported that when asked, president Vladimir Putin replied that Russia was being falsely accused. Julian Assange has also said that Russia was not the source of the emails. In July 2018, the Mueller investigation indicted 12 Russian intelligence officers for hacking and leaking the emails.

=== Yemen files ===
On 25 November 2016, WikiLeaks released emails and internal documents that provided details on the US military operations in Yemen from 2009 to March 2015. In a statement accompanying the release of the "Yemen Files", Assange said about the US involvement in the Yemen war: "The war in Yemen has produced 3.15 million internally displaced persons. Although the United States government has provided most of the bombs and is deeply involved in the conduct of the war itself reportage on the war in English is conspicuously rare".

=== PlusD ===
On 28 November 2016, WikiLeaks released more than 500,000 diplomatic cables sent by the United States Department of State in 1979 during the presidency of Jimmy Carter, documenting the Iranian hostage crisis. The cables were previously declassified and released by the National Archives and Records Administration.

=== German BND-NSA Inquiry ===
On 1 December 2016, WikiLeaks released 2,420 documents which it claims are from the German Parliamentary Committee investigating the NSA spying scandal. German security officials at first suspected the documents were obtained from a 2015 cyberattack on the Bundestag, but now suspect it was an internal leak.

=== Turkish AK Party emails ===
On 19 July 2016, in response to the Turkish government's purges that followed the coup attempt, WikiLeaks released 294,548 emails from Turkey's ruling Justice and Development party (AKP). According to WikiLeaks, the material, which it said was the first batch from the "AKP Emails", was obtained a week before the attempted coup in the country and "is not connected, in any way, to the elements behind the attempted coup, or to a rival political party or state". After WikiLeaks announced that they would release the emails, the organisation was for over 24 hours under a "sustained attack". Following the leak, the Turkish government ordered the Wikileaks site to be blocked nationwide.

Most experts and commentators agree that Phineas Fisher was behind the leak. Fisher asked WikiLeaks not to publish the AKP emails as she was still accessing files on the AKP network. After WikiLeaks published the emails, the AKP shut down its internal network and Fisher lost access. Fisher said WikiLeaks had told her that the emails were "all spam and crap."

WikiLeaks had also tweeted inaccurate descriptions of the leak contents and a link to a database which contained sensitive information, such as the Turkish Identification Number, of approximately 50 million Turkish citizens, including nearly every female voter in Turkey. The information first appeared online in April of the same year and was not in the files uploaded by WikiLeaks, but in files described by WikiLeaks as "the full data for the Turkey AKP emails and more" which was archived by Emma Best, who then removed it when the personal data was discovered.

WikiLeaks was criticised by some for including personal information and malware links in the emails. WikiLeaks responded by removing the first 300 publicly identified malware, but didn't do an analysis of its own for other malware. Over 33,000 more malicious files were later found by a security researcher.

== 2017 ==
=== CIA espionage orders ===
On 16 February 2017, WikiLeaks released a purported report on CIA espionage orders (marked as NOFORN) for the 2012 French presidential election. The order called for details of party funding, internal rivalries and future attitudes toward the United States. The Associated Press noted that "the orders seemed to represent standard intelligence-gathering."

=== Vault 7 ===
In March 2017, WikiLeaks has published more than 8,000 documents on the CIA. The confidential documents, codenamed Vault 7, dated from 2013 to 2016, included details on the CIA's software capabilities, such as the ability to compromise cars, smart TVs, web browsers (including Google Chrome, Microsoft Edge, Firefox, and Opera), and the operating systems of most smartphones (including Apple's iOS and Google's Android), as well as other operating systems such as Microsoft Windows, macOS, and Linux. In July 2022, Joshua Schulte was convicted of sending the information to WikiLeaks.

=== 2017 Macron email leak ===
On 5 May 2017, WikiLeaks posted links to e-mails purported to be from Emmanuel Macron's campaign in the French 2017 presidential election. The documents were first relayed on the 4chan forum and by pro-Trump Twitter accounts, and then by WikiLeaks, who indicated they did not author the leaks. Some experts have said that the WikiLeaks Twitter account played a key role in publicising the leaks through the hashtag #MacronLeaks just some three-and-a-half hours after the first tweet with the hashtag appeared. The campaign stated that false documents were mixed in with real ones, and that "the ambition of the authors of this leak is obviously to harm the movement En Marche! in the final hours before the second round of the French presidential election." France's Electoral Commission described the action as a "massive and coordinated piracy action."

France's Electoral Commission urged journalists not to report on the contents of the leaks, but to heed "the sense of responsibility they must demonstrate, as at stake are the free expression of voters and the sincerity of the election." Cybersecurity experts initially believed that groups linked to Russia were involved in this attack. The Kremlin denied any involvement. The head of the French cyber-security agency, ANSSI, later said that they did not have evidence connecting the hack with Russia, saying that the attack was so simple, that "we can imagine that it was a person who did this alone. They could be in any country."

=== Spy Files Russia ===
In September 2017, WikiLeaks released "Spy Files Russia," showing "how a Saint Petersburg-based technology company called Peter-Service helped state entities gather detailed data on Russian mobile phone users, part of a national system of online surveillance called System for Operative Investigative Activities (SORM)." Wired wrote that most of the information was already public, and the release "wasn’t exactly the type of radical secret-sharing WikiLeaks typically engages in." Andrei Soldatov, a Russian journalist specialising in digital surveillance and Russian intelligence said he did not think it was a real expose. Soldatov said the release was "more than nothing. At least we got some hint about the data exchange interface between telecoms and secret services." Moscow-based journalist Fred Weir said "experts say it casts a timely spotlight on the vast surveillance operations mounted by Russian security services." Ben Buchanan, a postdoctoral fellow at the Harvard Kennedy School's Belfer Center and author of the book The Cybersecurity Dilemma said the SORM system "has been known for some time, though the documents seem to provide additional technical specifications". Some suggested that Spy Files Russia was an approved release by the Russian government meant to shield them from criticism of collusion with WikiLeaks during the 2016 US presidential election. James Andrew Lewis, a vice-president at Center for Strategic and International Studies, said they were "tricks that the Russians were willing to give up."

=== Vault 8 ===
On 9 November 2017, WikiLeaks began publishing Vault 8, which it described as "source code and analysis for CIA software projects including those described in the Vault7 series." The stated intention of the Vault 8 publication was to "enable investigative journalists, forensic experts and the general public to better identify and understand covert CIA infrastructure components." The only Vault 8 release has been the source code and development logs for Hive, a covert communications platform for CIA malware. In July 2022, Joshua Schulte was convicted of sending the information to WikiLeaks.

== 2018 ==
=== ICE Patrol ===
On 22 June 2018, WikiLeaks published documents containing the personal details of many U.S. Immigration and Customs Enforcement (ICE) employees scraped from LinkedIn with the declared aim of "increasing accountability, especially in light of the extreme actions taken by ICE lately, such as the separation of children and parents at the US border". The database contained ICE employees’ publicly available personal information and job history scraped from LinkedIn, including their LinkedIn profile photos, their educational background and the city and state they're based in. According to the Washington Post, WikiLeaks reproduced a database by a New York-based artist and programmer named Sam Lavigne.

=== Allegation of a corrupted broker in France-UAE arms deal ===
On 28 September 2018, WikiLeaks published information related to a dispute over a commission payment for an arms deal between a French state-owned company GIAT Industries SA (now Nexter Systems) and the United Arab Emirates (UAE). The deal, which was signed in 1993 and was due for completion in 2008, involved the sale by Nexter to the UAE of 46 armoured vehicles, 388 Leclerc combat tanks, two training tanks, spare parts and ammunition. The dispute was brought to the International Chamber of Commerce (ICC) by Abbas Ibrahim Yousef Al Yousef, who acted as broker between the UAE and Nexter Systems. Yousef claimed that he was paid $40 million less than the $235 million he was promised by Nexter. Nexter justified stopping payments by saying that Yousef's company, Kenoza Consulting and Management, Inc., registered in the British Virgin Islands, had committed corrupt acts by, among other things, using German engines in its tanks, which violated laws forbidding arms sales from Germany to the Middle East. Yousef claimed he had obtained a waiver from those laws using lobby groups to contact "decision makers at the highest levels, both in France and Germany". Yousef's claims against Nexter Systems were dismissed when it became known that his charge from the deal would have been much less had he been paid on retainer.

== 2019 ==
=== Organisation for the Prohibition of Chemical Weapons ===
In November 2019, WikiLeaks released an email from an unnamed investigator from the Organisation for the Prohibition of Chemical Weapons (OPCW) team investigating the 2018 chemical attack in Douma (Syria). The investigator accused the OPCW of covering up discrepancies. Robert Fisk said that documents released by WikiLeaks indicated that the OPCW "suppressed or failed to publish, or simply preferred to ignore, the conclusions of up to 20 other members of its staff who became so upset at what they regarded as the misleading conclusions of the final report that they officially sought to have it changed in order to represent the truth". The head of OPCW, Fernando Arias, described the leak as containing "subjective views" and stood by the original conclusions.

In April 2018, WikiLeaks had offered a $100,000 reward for confidential information about "the alleged chemical attack in Douma, Syria." In a November 2020 interview with BBC, WikiLeaks' alleged source declined to say if he took money from the organisation.

In April 2021, a sting later led to allegations and email evidence of a pro-Assad conspiracy attempting to undermine the OPCW's investigation, and the involvement of Russian diplomats, WikiLeaks, and Julian Assange's lawyer Melinda Taylor. The Daily Beast and Newlines Magazine wrote that WikiLeaks had put Paul McKeigue in touch with Melinda Taylor, one of Julian Assange's lawyers, who suggested ways in which McKeigue could conduct lawfare against the Organisation for the Prohibition of Chemical Weapons (OPCW).

== 2021 ==
=== Intolerance Network ===
In 2021, Wikileaks published a searchable library of 17,000 documents from the right-wing groups HazteOir and CitizenGo. WikiLeaks said the documents appear to have been briefly available online in 2017 before being removed due to legal action.

== Unpublished material ==
- In October 2009, Assange said he was in possession of "5GB from Bank of America" that was from "one of the executive's hard drives". In November 2010, Assange said WikiLeaks was planning another "megaleak" for early in 2011, which would be from the private sector and involve "a big U.S. bank". Assange compared it to the Enron emails and called it "the ecosystem of corruption". Bank of America's stock price fell by three per cent following this announcement and speculation. Assange publicly said that the possible release "could take down a bank or two", but privately said that the information was dated and that he was not able to make sense of it or determine if it was newsworthy. WikiLeaks later said that the Bank of America information was among the documents that former spokesperson Daniel Domscheit-Berg said he had destroyed in August 2011. In 2012, Forbes published unreleased marketing material that confirmed the files were from Bank of America and that WikiLeaks planned on publishing them in January 2011.
- In chat messages in 2010, Assange told Manning that WikiLeaks had four months of telephone calls from the Icelandic Parliament.
- In March 2010, Daniel Domscheit-Berg, at the time WikiLeaks' spokesperson, announced on a podcast that the organisation had in its possession around 37,000 internal e-mails from far-right National Democratic Party of Germany. He stated that he was not working on this project himself because it would make him legally vulnerable as a German citizen. According to him, Wikileaks was working on a crowd sourcing-based tool to exploit such masses of data. WikiLeaks said that these e-mails (which it said numbered 60,000) were among the documents that Domscheit-Berg said he had destroyed in August 2011.
- In May 2010, WikiLeaks said it had video footage of an alleged massacre of Afghan civilians by the U.S. military, which it said it was preparing to release. This may have been among the videos that WikiLeaks reported that former spokesperson Domscheit-Berg destroyed in August 2011.
- In July 2010, during an interview with Chris Anderson, Assange showed a document WikiLeaks had on an Albanian oil well blowout, and said it also had material from inside BP, and that it was "getting [an] enormous quantity of whistle-blower disclosures of a very high caliber" but added that WikiLeaks has not been able to verify and release the material because it does not have enough volunteer journalists.
- In a September 2010 Twitter post, WikiLeaks stated that it had a first-edition copy of Operation Dark Heart, a memoir by a U.S. Army intelligence officer. The uncensored first printing of around 9,500 copies was purchased and destroyed by the U.S. Department of Defense in its entirety.
- In October 2010, Assange told a leading Moscow newspaper that "[t]he Kremlin had better brace itself for a coming wave of WikiLeaks disclosures about Russia." In late November, Assange stated, "we have material on many businesses and governments, including in Russia. It's not right to say there's going to be a particular focus on Russia". On 23 December 2010, the Russian newspaper Novaya Gazeta announced that it had been granted access to a wide range of materials from the WikiLeaks database. The newspaper said that it will begin releasing these materials in January 2011, with an eye toward exposing corruption in the Russian government.
- In December 2010, Assange's lawyer, Mark Stephens, said on The Andrew Marr Show that WikiLeaks had information that it considers to be a "thermo-nuclear device" that it would release if the organisation needs to defend itself.
- In January 2011, Rudolf Elmer hand delivered two CDs to Assange during a news conference in London. Elmer said the CDs contained the names of around 2,000 tax-evading clients of the Swiss bank Julius Baer.
- In February 2011 in his memoir, Inside WikiLeaks: My Time with Julian Assange at the World's Most Dangerous Website, Daniel Domscheit-Berg acknowledged that he and another former WikiLeaks volunteer have material submitted to WikiLeaks in their possession (as well as the source code to the site's submission system), which they would only return to the organisation once it repaired its security and online infrastructure. In August 2011 Domscheit-Berg announced that he destroyed all 3,500 documents in his possession. The German newspaper Der Spiegel reported that the documents included the U.S. government's No Fly List. WikiLeaks also claimed that the data destroyed by Domscheit-Berg included the No Fly List. This is the first mention of WikiLeaks having had possession of the No Fly List. WikiLeaks also said that the data destroyed included information that it had previously announced was its possession but had not released publicly. This information included "five gigabytes from the Bank of America" (which was previously reported to be in WikiLeaks' possession in October 2009), "60,000 emails from the NPD" (which Domscheit-Berg divulged to be in Wikileaks' possession in March 2010, back when he still worked with the organisation), and "videos of a major US atrocity in Afghanistan" (which perhaps include the one it claimed to have in May 2010) Additionally, WikiLeaks claimed that the documents destroyed included "the internals of around 20 neo-Nazi organizations" and "US intercept arrangements for over a hundred internet companies".
- The Daily Dot reported that WikiLeaks' Syria Files excluded "records of a €2 billion transaction between the Syrian regime and a government-owned Russian bank," citing court documents.
- In March 2013, Assange said WikiLeaks had classified material it wouldn't release during the court martial of Chelsea Manning. He confirmed they had received unreleased classified material from Manning related to the US military allegedly turning a blind eye to Baghdad police arrests and persecution of political opponents of Iraqi Prime Minister Nouri al-Maliki.
- In June 2013, BuzzFeed News published documents stamped "SECRET" from Ecuador's SENAIN that showed the country's use of domestic spying tools. BuzzFeed's source said they attempted to leak them to WikiLeaks but were unsuccessful. WikiLeaks spokesman Kristinn Hrafnsson called this claim "false" and said "No one in our team recognises having been approached with such material".
- In 2015, Cynthia Viteri and Fernando Villavicencio sent secret documents to WikiLeaks showing that Ecuador was using an Italian company to run a surveillance program that was spying on journalists and political enemies, in addition to spying on Assange in the embassy. The New York Times reported that leaked chat logs from 2015 show that Assange and his inner circle were aware of the documents, which were not published by WikiLeaks.
- In 2016, the source for the Panama Papers said they approached WikiLeaks about the documents but that "WikiLeaks didn’t answer its tip line repeatedly".
- In the summer of 2016, according to Foreign Policy WikiLeaks received several leaks from a source including 68 gigabytes from the Russian Interior Ministry. In 2014, the BBC and others reported on "less than half the data" that was offered to WikiLeaks in 2016. WikiLeaks told Foreign Policy that "WikiLeaks rejects all submissions that it cannot verify. WikiLeaks rejects submissions that have already been published elsewhere or which are likely to be considered insignificant. WikiLeaks has never rejected a submission due to its country of origin".
- In August 2016, WikiLeaks announced that they had a "pristine copy" of The Shadow Brokers archive which they said they would release "in due course".
- On 4 October 2016, Julian Assange announced that WikiLeaks would release a million documents related to the US election and three governments before the end of the year. Topics included war, arms, Google, mass surveillance, oil, Julian Assange and the U.S. election.
- In October 2016, WikiLeaks tweeted a code for an "insurance file" that hinted about an upcoming leak. The New York Times reported that former WikiLeaks insiders said Assange had damaging information involving Ecuador that WikiLeaks had been going to publish.

== See also ==
- List of public disclosures of classified information
- List of government surveillance projects
- List of material published by Distributed Denial of Secrets
