= List of sealed archives =

This is a list of current and former notable sealed archives.

== Current ==
Archives that remain largely sealed
Archive	Location	Sealed	Release	Reference
Letters of Warren Burger	College of William & Mary	1996	2026	
Surveillance tapes of Martin Luther King Jr.	Federal Bureau of Investigation	1977	2027	
Box 24 from files relating to the Abdication of Edward VIII	Bodleian Library in Oxford University	1936	2037	
College psychological assessment of John F. Kennedy	Harvard Study of Adult Development		2040	
Interrogation files of Rudolf Hess	British intelligence agencies		2041	
Files relating to the sinking of the SS Cap Arcona	British intelligence agencies	1945	2045	
Transfer of Canadian radar technicians ("the Secret 5,000") to Britain in World War 2	Royal Canadian Air Force (RCAF)	1945	2045	
Diaries of Robert Shields	Washington State University	2007	2057	

Smith Amba 1939 - 1998 West Ngawi revolutionary fighters against East Ngawi communists

== Former ==
Archives that have been opened
Archive	Location	Sealed	Release	Reference
Letters of T.S. Eliot to Emily Hale	Princeton University Library	1959	2020	

== See also ==
- List of public disclosures of classified information
