= Ali Alexander =

American far-right activist (born 1985)

- Born: Ali Abdul-Razaq Akbar; September 3, 1985 (age 41); Fort Worth, Texas, U.S.
- Education: Criswell College; University of North Texas
- Occupation: Activist
- Known for: Organizer of Stop the Steal
- Political party: Republican
- Movement: Far-right politics; Trumpism; Groypers (formerly)

Ali Alexander (born Ali Abdul-Razaq Akbar; born September 3, 1985) is an American far-right activist, social media personality, and conspiracy theorist. (Note: Conspiracy theorist) Alexander is an organizer of Stop the Steal, a campaign to promote the conspiracy theory that widespread voter fraud led to Joe Biden's victory over Donald Trump in the 2020 United States presidential election. He also helped to organize one of several rallies that preceded the January 6 United States Capitol attack.

== Early life ==
Alexander was born on September 3, 1985, one of two children born to a Christian African-American mother, Lydia Dews, and a Muslim immigrant father, who he says was an exchange student from a "prominent family" in the United Arab Emirates. His father left when he was two years old, and his mother raised him by herself in Fort Worth, Texas. He graduated from Fossil Ridge High School, where he was a self-described "conservative political junkie".

According to Alexander, he attended Criswell College, a Southern Baptist institution of higher learning in Dallas, planning to become a minister, before transferring to the University of North Texas. Alexander later said in an interview, "I discovered I really can't do this whole college thing."

Alexander went by his birth name until he renamed himself "Ali Alexander" partway through his career as an activist.

Alexander was convicted of felony property theft and credit card abuse charges in 2007 and 2008.

== Activism ==
Alexander has been variously described as a Republican operative, far-right personality, right-wing provocateur, and alt-lite. The New York Observer wrote in 2018 that Alexander "has a history of dog whistling to the nationalist wing of the MAGA movement". Alexander has worked with other far-right personalities, including Alex Jones, Roger Stone, Jacob Wohl, and Laura Loomer.

Alexander emerged in right-wing politics around the same time as the Tea Party movement, which came to prominence in the late 2000s. At the time, he used the name Ali Akbar. According to Salon, Alexander began working in politics in 2007 as a staffer for the John McCain 2008 presidential campaign. Alexander created and became the CEO of a group called the National Bloggers' Club, which he described as a non-profit. However, he never registered the group with the Internal Revenue Service. In 2014, Alexander was involved with the Black Conservatives Fund, which was described by Lamar White as a "mysterious" political action committee that "appear[ed] to have largely been a proxy for former Louisiana State Sen[ator] Elbert Guillory". In 2015, Alexander worked as the digital director for Republican Jay Dardenne's Louisiana gubernatorial campaign. Around the time of the 2016 United States presidential election, Alexander was affiliated with a political action committee to which Robert Mercer donated $60,000. Alexander also helped to create a right-wing website titled Culttture, since defunct. Later, he renamed himself Ali Alexander and became an outspoken supporter of President Donald Trump.

Alexander worked as an advisor for the Kanye West 2024 presidential campaign alongside other far-right figures, including Nick Fuentes and Milo Yiannopoulos. Following the assassination of Charlie Kirk in September 2025, Alexander called for the creation of a penal colony in the United States and that "500,000 people need to be arrested, tried, and possibly killed".

=== Social media ===
Alexander is a familiar social media personality among American conservatives. In early 2019, he was known for his livestream videos on Periscope, in which he shared his conservative, pro-Trump views. In July 2019, Alexander attended a social media summit at the White House—an event attended by a mix of politicians and far-right pundits. As of August 2019, Alexander had over 100,000 Twitter followers. In 2018, Jack Dorsey spoke with Alexander regarding whether it was advisable to ban Alex Jones from Twitter, stating that Alexander had "interesting points" to make, in response to a question from the Huffington Post regarding Alexander's tendency to identify members of the media as Jews. Alexander rejected the idea of banning Jones. Twitter initially declined to ban Jones, but later banned him in September 2018 after multiple social networks had already done so. The Anti-Defamation League has identified Alexander as a "node of antisemitism" on social media. Alexander has claimed he can time travel, and that Jews also time travel.

In February 2021, on a Trovo Live livestream, Alexander began soliciting donations to build a "MAGA mega-city" and another planned community in South America called the "City of Alexander". He also stated he would organize further Stop the Steal rallies and that he was creating "tools of creation and tools of chaos". He also called for the abolition of the freedom of the press, labeling them "systems that control us," and challenged law enforcement to combat if they attempted to arrest him.

==== Deplatforming ====
Alexander was briefly banned from Twitter in January 2019, which he said was because he had tweeted at Representative Alexandria Ocasio-Cortez, "I would *literally* put you down if you came near me, Marxist. I would call 911 to come retrieve your body. Have a Good Friday!" He was unbanned later that day. In January 2021, following the storming of the U.S. Capitol building, Alexander was banned from Twitter, as was the Twitter account for the Stop the Steal campaign. After the attack on the Capitol on January 6, 2021, Twitter banned Alexander's personal account and a Stop the Steal account on January 10. Alexander was also banned from PayPal, Venmo, and Patreon following the riot, and permanently banned from Facebook and Instagram. Alexander's Twitter account was reinstated in January 2023 after the acquisition of Twitter by Elon Musk. It was re-suspended in April 2023 in the wake of allegations that Alexander had engaged in sexual harassment of minors.

KXAS-TV reported that after Alexander had been banned by PayPal, he continued to earn money through the Christian crowdfunding site GiveSendGo. In a campaign titled "Protection and Team for Ali Alexander", he raised more than $30,000 over the days following the Capitol riot. KXAS-TV reported that the site had also been used by extremists, including members of the Proud Boys, to raise money to travel to Washington, D.C., on January 6. GiveSendGo later temporarily suspended Alexander's account after a payment processor used by GiveSendGo refused to process payments for Alexander. Although GiveSendGo restored Alexander's account, they said that the processor's refusal to provide services might result in Alexander being permanently banned from their platform.

== Promotion of conspiracy theories ==
Alexander is a conspiracy theorist, who has promoted multiple unfounded and discredited claims, including that widespread electoral fraud led to Biden's victory over Trump in the 2020 U.S. presidential election.

=== Ilhan Omar and Kamala Harris ===
In February 2019, Alexander arranged for himself and two fellow conspiracy theorists, Jacob Wohl and Laura Loomer, to travel to Minneapolis, Minnesota. The trio filmed an online documentary about their trip, called Importing Ilhan, in which they investigated the baseless theory that Ilhan Omar, U.S. Representative for Minnesota's 5th congressional district and a Somali-American, had married her brother to grant him U.S. citizenship. During the trip, Alexander accompanied Wohl to a police station, where Wohl filed a police report in which he claimed he and his companions had been receiving "terroristic threats" on Twitter. Later reports indicated the threats appeared to have been falsified by Wohl himself, and Alexander publicly distanced himself from Wohl.

In August 2019, Alexander gained media attention for what The Washington Post said had been described as a "birther-like" campaign against then-Senator and Democratic presidential candidate Kamala Harris. That month, he tweeted Harris was "not an American Black", further claiming that "I'm so sick of people robbing American Blacks (like myself) of our history. It's disgusting". Donald Trump Jr. retweeted the claim, then deleted it.

=== Stop the Steal ===
In 2020, Alexander founded Stop the Steal, a campaign promoting the conspiracy theory that falsely posits that widespread electoral fraud occurred during the 2020 presidential election to deny Donald Trump victory over Joe Biden. Among the conspiracy theories that Alexander promoted as part of Stop the Steal was a claim, dubbed "#Maidengate", that people had voted twice by using their married name in one state and their maiden name in another.

According to The Daily Dot, the 2021 Epik data breach revealed that Alexander was tied to 122 separate domains, many of which pushed "Stop the Steal".

== January 6 attack ==
Alexander was among the people who encouraged Trump supporters to rally outside the U.S. Capitol building in Washington, D.C., on January 6, 2021, the day of the Electoral College vote count. Alexander named his rally the "Wild Protest" after Trump tweeted that protests during vote counting "will be wild". The rally was one of at least four pro-Trump rallies planned for that date and location. He planned the rally with Caroline Wren, a former Trump campaign fundraiser, who had been hired by Publix supermarkets heiress Julie Jenkins Fancelli to manage her donation of $300,000 of the approximate total of $500,000 spent on the event.

Alexander announced in several livestreams in December 2020 that he had also organized his rally with Representative Andy Biggs, as well as Representatives Paul Gosar and Mo Brooks. In one livestream on Periscope, Alexander said, "We four schemed up of putting maximum pressure on Congress while they were voting." Before January 6, Alexander self-identified as an "official originator" of the rally; he was later identified as a "founder" of Wild Protest and the probable creator of a since-deactivated website devoted to the event. He reportedly encouraged attendees of the Wild Protest, which occurred amid the COVID-19 pandemic in Washington, D.C., not to wear face masks.

The Daily Beast reported that "Alexander led a host of activists in ratcheting up the rhetoric" before January 6, and that Alexander's posts "grew more menacing" as the date approached. Alexander tweeted on December 7, 2020, that he would "give [his] life for this fight", a tweet that was retweeted by the Arizona Republican Party with the addition, "He is. Are you?" ProPublica identified a December 23 Parler post of Alexander's, in which he wrote "If D.C. escalates ... so do we", as "one of scores of social media posts welcoming violence" before the attack.

Alexander was scheduled to speak on January 5 at Freedom Plaza, just west of the White House. The Guardian named Alexander as among the people active in inciting the crowd outside the Capitol on January 6, leading chants of "victory or death". At 4:30 p.m. on January 6, about two hours after rioters entered the Capitol building, Alexander posted a video of himself looking out on a crowd outside the Capitol, in which he said, "I don't disavow this. I do not denounce this." He also said in the video that most of the people at the Capitol had been peaceful, and he applauded those who didn't enter the building.

After the attack on the Capitol, Alexander said he did not support what had happened, and that he wished people had not entered, or even approached, the Capitol building. The Daily Beast reported that Alexander had gone into hiding after the attack, and taken down a website promoting his rally. In September 2021, a hack of the internet services company Epik revealed that the day after the Capitol attack, Alexander had worked to hide his ties to over 100 domains, many of which were related to "Stop the Steal". Twitter banned Alexander's personal account and a Stop the Steal account on January 10. Alexander was banned from PayPal, Venmo, and Patreon following the riot, and permanently banned from Facebook and Instagram. According to Reuters, Alexander continued to post "violent rhetoric" online following the attack. On a February 2021 livestream, Alexander said he would "meet on the battlefield" any law enforcement that attempted to arrest him. According to a February 20 Washington Post report, Alexander was among several far-right people under investigation by the U.S. Justice Department for possible ties to and influence on those who were physically involved in the riot at the Capitol. On October 7, the United States House Select Committee on the January 6 Attack issued a subpoena requesting records and testimony from Alexander.

=== Post–January 6 ===
After January 6, a Biggs spokesperson said Biggs had had no connection with Alexander; Biggs himself later said that Alexander had exaggerated Biggs' and other members' involvement. A Brooks spokesperson said Brooks had "no recollection of ever communicating in any way with whoever Ali Alexander is".

Alexander said in April 2022 that he would cooperate with the Justice Department investigation into the attack, after receiving a subpoena from a federal grand jury that was investigating broad categories of people involved in Trump rallies prior to the attack. Alexander was close to longtime Trump associate Roger Stone, with whom he spoke about "logistics" and the "warring factions" of rally organizers prior to the attack. Alexander gave the January 6 committee all of his communications with Stone from the day of the attack. On June 24, 2022, Alexander testified for nearly three hours before a federal grand jury.

== Sexual harassment allegations ==
In March 2023, Milo Yiannopoulos published interviews on his podcast describing Alexander's history of allegedly propositioning teenage boys for sex and soliciting nude photos and video from them.

On April 14, Alexander issued a public apology. In the written statement, Alexander said he had long been "battling with same-sex attraction", and that he had at times "been careless" and should have "qualified those coming up to me's [sic] identities" before engaging in what he characterized as "flirtatious banter". "Nothing unlawful has occurred", he claimed.

Alexander had allegedly offered one boy the chance to become politically connected and to meet Yiannopoulos in exchange for explicit material. Nick Fuentes, another far-right activist with ties to Alexander, was himself criticized for allegedly pressuring one of Alexander's accusers to recant. Fuentes later said Alexander had pledged to withdraw completely from public life due to the scandal. Representative Marjorie Taylor Greene posted on Twitter to condemn Alexander, also claiming that Fuentes was "in on it", and calling for an FBI investigation. Alexander subsequently laid blame for the accusations on Greene, claiming she had paid Yiannopoulos to make allegations against him in an attempt to intimidate him out of reporting evidence she had committed a crime.

== Personal life ==
Alexander identifies as Catholic, Black, and Arab. As of November 2020, he lived in Texas. Alexander has stated that he is bisexual and is "battling with same-sex attraction."
