= ODIN Intelligence =

American technology company

ODIN Intelligence is a technology company that makes database software for law enforcement. Its primary products are SONAR (Sex Offender Notification and Registration), SweepWizard (for law enforcement raids), and HMIS (Homeless Management Information System). HMIS includes facial recognition for identification. The company's private data, including raids and personally identifiable information, was documented in a breach in January 2023.

== Company history ==
Erik McCauley is the founder and CEO.

After the company's private databases were exposed in early January 2023, TechCrunch reported about three leaked databases totaling approximately 16 gigabytes that were published and verified by Distributed Denial of Secrets. AWS GovCloud private keys were published as well. The data included tactical plans for police raids, police reports, a forensic extraction report, AFR Engine data, and audio from raids, dating from 2011 to December 2022.

On January 15, the company's website was defaced in January 2023 in response to McCauley's dismissing of the data breach. The website was taken down on January 19 and remains offline as of January 22. On January 17, the company acknowledged the data breach to the California Attorney General's Office. The company also removed Apple and Android apps.

The company's website stated their products were Criminal Justice Information Services–compliant, which was also documented to at least one customer; Wired stated it was clearly not compliant.

=== SweepWizard ===
SweepWizard is used to track and coordinate police raids.

SweepWizard was used in a 64-agency effort, Operation Protect the Innocent, which rounded up over 600 suspected sex offenders in September 2022.

Data from SweepWizard was found exposed in the January 2023 data breach, including personal identifying information on over 5000 individuals and social security numbers for over 1000 individuals. WIRED verified the unauthenticated API endpoint that returned breached data; in response, CEO McCauley stated "we have been unable to reproduce the alleged security compromise to any ODIN system".

=== HMIS ===
HMIS, or Homeless Management Information System, is used to catalog homeless populations, including demographic data, interaction tracking, criminal and warrant history, and labels such as "needles", "assaultive", and "registered sex offender". A company brochure for the product states "Police use ODIN facial recognition to identify even non-verbal or intoxicated individuals".

=== SOMS ===
SONAR (Sex Offender Notification and Registration) or SOMS (Sex Offender Management System) is used to register sex offenders.
