= Cyprus Confidential =

Leak and investigative journalism about Cyprus

Cyprus Confidential is a journalism project investigating financial services in Cyprus and their role in allowing avoidance of international sanctions, and implementation of Russian state goals. It is conducted by the International Consortium of Investigative Journalists, Paper Trail Media and 69 media partners including Distributed Denial of Secrets and the Organized Crime and Corruption Reporting Project (OCCRP) and more than 270 journalists in 55 countries and territories. Other media partners included Arab Reporters for Investigative Journalism, the Belarusian Investigative Center, The Bureau of Investigative Journalism, CBC, Der Spiegel, The Guardian, Le Monde, Politiken, Swedish Television (SVT), Syrian Investigative Reporting for Accountability Journalism, Ukraine's Slidstvo and The Washington Post.

The investigation suggests that "67 of the 105 Russian billionaires on the 2023 Forbes World’s Billionaires List used financial services firms on the island of Cyprus to hide their wealth and keep it out of reach from Western sanctions". The leaks include confidential information from financial services companies, mostly with connections to Cyprus, showing strong links with high-up figures in the Kremlin, some of whom have been sanctioned.

The investigation reveals how Russian oligarchs transferred large amounts of assets to Cyprus after the Russian invasion of Ukraine. The United States, the United Kingdom and the European Union imposed sanctions on more than 1,600 individuals and entities after Moscow launched its invasion of Ukraine in February 2022.

== Investigation ==
=== Leak ===
The investigation is based on 3.6 million leaked files from the mid-1990s to April 2022, and include confidential background checks, organizational charts, financial statements, bank account applications and emails. The leaks come from six Cyprus-based financial services providers and a Latvian firm that sells Cypriot corporate registry documents:

- ConnectedSky
- Cypcodirect
- DJC Accountants
- i-Cyprus
- Kallias & Associates
- MeritKapital
- MeritServus

According to the ICIJ

The leaked records from Cypcodirect, ConnectedSky, i-Cyprus and Kallias & Associates were obtained by Paper Trail Media. Distributed Denial of Secrets obtained documents from Kallias & Associates, which were then shared with Paper Trail Media and ICIJ. DJC Accountants’ records were obtained by Distributed Denial of Secrets and shared by the Organized Crime and Corruption Reporting Project.

=== Findings ===
The investigation found more than 650 companies and trusts registered in Cyprus and more than 100 in other secrecy jurisdictions that were owned or controlled by Russians who have been sanctioned since 2014. The companies and trusts used to hide properties and other investments from oversight and included mother companies of Russian holdings and subsidiaries of Russian conglomerates including Evraz, which supplies the train rails used to transport arms and ammunition to Russian troops in Ukraine.

The investigation purports to show "how 67 of the 105 Russian billionaires on the 2023 Forbes World’s Billionaires List used financial services firms on the island of Cyprus to hide their wealth and keep it out of reach from Western sanctions". The leaks contain confidential information from financial services companies, mostly with connections to Cyprus, and show that country to have strong links with high-up figures in the Kremlin, some of whom have been sanctioned.

The investigation reveals how Russian oligarchs transferred large amounts of assets to Cyprus after the Russian invasion of Ukraine. The US, UK and EU imposed sanctions on more than 1,600 individuals and entities after Moscow launched its invasion of Ukraine in February 2022. The investigation found that Cyprus financial firms were working for more than 95 sanctioned individuals and 44 PEPs who were "linked to state-owned companies or organizations deemed to merit added scrutiny because of a heightened risk involving corruption or other illicit activity".

The investigation revealed secret talks to help Syria evade oil-industry sanctions and that German journalist Hubert Seipel had received more than $700,000 from a shell company linked to Russian oligarch Alexei Mordashov as a "sponsorship" to write books about Vladimir Putin and the "political environment in the Russian Federation". The investigation also revealed how the spyware firm Intellexa exploited loopholes in Cyprus and that US surveillance giant Verint Systems's network of operations includes subsidiaries in India.

The investigation implicated Bulgarian businessman Ognian Bozarov in the payment behind the 2008 bombing and assassination of Ivo Pukanić and another journalist at the Croatian magazine Nacional, which Bozarov denied and was never connected or charged in the case by the authorities, remaining innocent as they did not find any proof of his involvement. It also revealed Sudanese businessman and alleged Hamas financier Abdelbasit Hamza's involvement with a Cyprus company that mines Egyptian gold.

The investigation revealed that prominent accounting firms, such as PwC and Deloitte, played significant roles in facilitating financial maneuvers for Russian oligarchs. PwC assisted Russian billionaires in swiftly moving their assets ahead of impending sanctions, including facilitating a $1.4 billion transfer for Alexei Mordashov on the day he was sanctioned by the European Union. Similarly, Deloitte maintained close ties with the now-sanctioned Cyprus firm MeritServus, which was accused of shielding oligarchs' wealth.

The investigation uncovered that Russian oligarchs, including Roman Abramovich, transferred significant assets to Cyprus-based entities in attempts to evade sanctions. For instance, a majority ownership stake in Abramovich's art collection, worth nearly $1 billion, was transferred to his ex-wife Dasha Zhukova prior to sanctions.

In January 2025, Cyprus Confidential files revealed that Abramovich used a Cyprus-based company, Blue Ocean Yacht Management, to avoid paying VAT on expenses related to his superyachts. The scheme, active between 2005 and 2012, falsely claimed the yachts were rented commercially, allowing VAT avoidance on costs like fuel and maintenance.

In 2012, Cypriot authorities ruled that Blue Ocean owed €14 million in unpaid taxes. After years of legal challenges, the Supreme Court of Cyprus upheld the ruling in March 2024. Abramovich’s representatives denied any wrongdoing, stating he acted on professional tax advice.

== Response ==
=== Government responses ===
Governments including Cyprus president Nikos Christodoulides and European lawmakers began responding to the investigation's findings in less than 24 hours.

In November 2023, members of the European Parliament called for a crackdown on financial corruption and for member states that allow sanctions violations to be held accountable. Sophie in 't Veld the Parliament rapporteur for penalties for the violation of Union restrictive measures said that "When it’s about corruption and financial wrongdoings, the national authorities very often are the culprits. They’re complicit. The European Union is turning into a gangster’s paradise, because there is complete impunity." That month, Cyprus president Christodoulides promised to launch a probe and Cyprus Finance Minister Makis Keravnos said a criminal investigation had been initiated against firms including PwC for Russian sanctions violations.

In December 2023, the United States announced it was sending two dozen experts from the Federal Bureau of Investigation and the Financial Crimes Enforcement Network to Cyprus to assist with 29 cases related to money laundering and Russian sanctions violations.

=== Other ===
The Greens–European Free Alliance called for EU countries to close loopholes in response to the investigation.

== See also ==
- Paradise Papers
- Pandora Papers
- Suisse secrets
- Distributed Denial of Secrets
