= Cthulhu (developer) =

British Tor hidden service developer and administrator

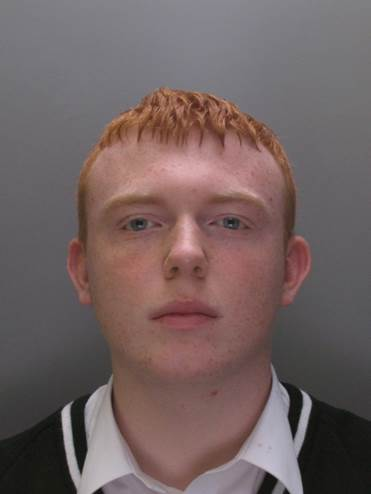
Mug shot of Thomas White

Thomas White, also known as Cthulhu, is a British computer programmer who co-founded Silk Road 2.0 and Distributed Denial of Secrets. In 2019, he was sentenced to five years in prison on various charges in the United Kingdom related to his operation of Silk Road 2.0 and for possessing indecent images of children.

== Career ==
White claimed to have worked in a security vetted/cleared role at Enhanced Developed Vetting (eDV) level from August 2013 to December 2016 on his LinkedIn profile. White was consulted on a number of Tor security matters such as dark web scams, law enforcement raids and darknet markets.

White co-founded Silk Road 2.0 in 2013. In November 2014, White was arrested as the mastermind behind Silk Road 2.0.

In January 2016 he hosted a release of the files hacked from the Fraternal Order of Police. He has hosted a number of other data dumps including those associated with Hacking Team, Ashley Madison, and Patreon.

In 2018, White founded Distributed Denial of Secrets, which has been called a successor to the web leak depository Wikileaks.

== Sentencing ==
In April 2019, for his activities with Silk Road 2.0, White pleaded guilty to charges in the United Kingdom including drug trafficking, money laundering, as well as making indecent images of children, and was sentenced to a total of 5 years and 4 months in prison.

In 2026, National Crime Agency officer Paul Chowles, who had been part of the operation that led to White's arrest, was sentenced to five years in prison for stealing £60,000 worth of cryptocurrency (since accumulated in value to over £4000,000) from White after his arrest. The theft was discovered after White, now released from prison, was given a confiscation order requiring him to turn over all the money he had earned from the site and found that a large quantity of cryptocurrency had already been withdrawn from his account without his knowledge. Chowles was also ordered to pay over £1000,000 in compensation to White, although White would never receive this compensation as it was immediately seized due to White's existing confiscation order.
