= List of public disclosures of classified information =

This is a list of classified information and documents leaked to the public.

== Global ==
- Lagarde list
- Global surveillance disclosures (2013–present)
- 2012 Stratfor email leak: Public disclosure of a number of internal emails between global intelligence company Stratfor's employees and its clients.
- Unaoil Leak: A leaked cache of emails dating from 2001 to 2012 sent within Unaoil revealed that Unaoil's operatives bribed officials in oil-producing nations in order to win government-funded projects.
- Panama Papers: Public disclosure of 11.5 million leaked documents detailing attorney–client information for more than 214,000 offshore companies associated with the Panamanian law firm and corporate service provider, Mossack Fonseca.
- Paradise Papers: Public disclosure of 13.4 million leaked documents relating to offshore investments.

== By country ==
=== China ===
- The Tiananmen Papers: A compilation of top secret official documents alleged to have been created by the Chinese government regarding the Tiananmen Square protests of 1989.

=== Germany ===
- Rosenholz files: A collection of 381 CD-ROMs containing 280,000 files were taken from former East Germany. The files ended up with the Central Intelligence Agency (CIA) during the German reunification trying to figure out why and who and will not give any info to Germany

=== Japan ===
- Siemens scandal: A political scandal of late Meiji and Taishō period Japanese politics, leading to the fall of the cabinet of Yamamoto Gonnohyoe. It involved collusion between several high-ranking members of the Imperial Japanese Navy, the British company Vickers and the German industrial conglomerate of Siemens AG.

=== Luxembourg ===
- Luxembourg Leaks: A leak based on confidential information about Luxembourg’s tax rulings set up by PricewaterhouseCoopers from 2002 to 2010 to the benefits of its clients. This investigation resulted in making available to the public tax rulings for over three hundred multinational companies based in Luxembourg.

=== Pakistan ===
- Hamoodur Rahman Commission Report: Official and now-declassified papers of the events leading up to loss of the Bangladesh and the 1971 war with Bangladesh.

=== Palestinian territories ===
- Palestine Papers: Largest news leak in the history of the Israeli–Palestinian conflict, released in January 2011 by Al Jazeera.

=== Slovenia ===
- 2011 Slovenian YouTube incident: Publication of three YouTube video clip recordings of several closed sessions held by the Government of Slovenia in 2011.

=== Spain ===
- Bárcenas affair: Publication of documents that allegedly indicate that the ruling People’s Party kept, for many years, a parallel bookkeeping system to record undeclared and illegal cash donations, and used them to pay bonuses to senior members of the party as well as for daily party expenses.

=== Switzerland ===
- Swiss Leaks: Publication of a giant tax evasion scheme allegedly operated with the knowledge and encouragement of the British multinational bank HSBC via its Swiss subsidiary, HSBC Private Bank (Suisse).

=== Syria ===
- Syria Files: A collection of more than two million emails from Syrian political figures and ministries.

=== United Kingdom ===
- Downing Street memo: Memo of a secret meeting of senior British Labour government, defence and intelligence figures discussing the build-up to the Iraq War.
- MI-6 agents list: In May 1999, a list of 116 alleged MI6 agents was sent to the LaRouche movement's publication Executive Intelligence Review, a weekly magazine which published it online.

=== United States ===
- Pentagon Papers: Top secret documents of the United States Department of Defense regarding its involvement in the Vietnam War.
- Afghan War documents leak: Disclosure of a collection of internal U.S. military logs of the War in Afghanistan.
- Iraq War documents leak: A WikiLeaks disclosure of a collection of 391,832 United States Army field reports.
- United States diplomatic cables leak: A WikiLeaks disclosure of classified cables that had been sent to the U.S. State Department by 274 of its consulates, embassies, and diplomatic missions around the world.
- Guantanamo Bay files leak: Classified assessments, interviews, and internal memos about detainees, which were written by the Pentagon's Joint Task Force Guantanamo.
- CIA interrogation tapes: Videotapes made by CIA during interrogations of Al-Qaeda suspects.
- Vault 7: A WikiLeaks disclosure of a CIA's hacking techniques and capabilities to perform electronic surveillance.
- Pentagon Document Leaks: Photographed printouts of two sets of foreign intelligence documents were made by an airman first class of the Massachusetts Air National Guard.

== Other ==
- Summers memo
- Bush–Aznar memo
- "The Assessment" (1963) : Alleged NATO Cosmic Top Secret document of few thousand of pages, where just couple of pages of this document is leaked in an obscure British magazine during the 1990s.

== See also ==
- List of government surveillance projects
- Information published by WikiLeaks
- Data breach
- List of sealed archives
