= Emma Best (journalist) =

American journalist and whistleblower

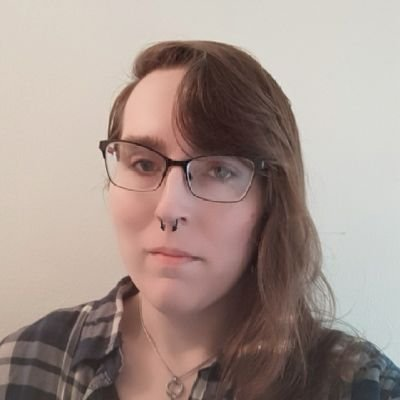
- Best in 2022
- Occupation: Investigative reporter
- Organization: MuckRock
- Notable work: Distributed Denial of Secrets
- Website: Official website

Emma Best is an American activist and reporter whose career has been outside of mainstream media. Best files Freedom of Information Act (FOIA) requests on behalf of MuckRock and co-founded the whistleblower site Distributed Denial of Secrets (DDoSecrets).

During the first Trump administration, Best reported on the FBI files of President Donald Trump, his associate Roger Stone, and a company owned by then-Treasury Secretary Steven Mnuchin.

Best has been referred to as a former hacker and a "journalist and transparency advocate with a specialty in counterintelligence and national security".

== Career ==
Best has said that before becoming a transparency activist and investigative journalist, they worked for Wikistrat and subcontractors hired by the Intelligence Community before becoming disillusioned. They left over concerns for source safety and bureaucratic obstruction, and have discussed disillusionment about surveillance, police militarization, and expansion of the military. Best said in 2020 that they had not kept in touch with old colleagues.

=== Activism ===
In July 2016, Best uploaded 3,471 issues of Time magazine from 1923 to 2014 to be freely available online. This may have violated Time's terms and conditions. Best released a statement that included a quote from the magazine's founder, Henry R Luce: "Journalism is the art of collecting varying kinds of information (commonly called news) which a few people possess and of transmitting it to a much larger number of people who are supposed to desire to share it."

=== Freedom of Information Act ===
From 2016 to 2020, Best filed more than 6,000 Freedom of Information Act (FOIA) requests, including numerous requests to U.S. intelligence services and over 1,600 with the FBI, and published hundreds of articles.

In 2016, the Federal Bureau of Investigation investigated and considered prosecuting Best for their use of FOIA. According to the Calyx Institute, Best "consistently sits at or near the top of FBI's list of vexsome FOIA requesters".

In 2017, Best helped get the CIA database of 13 million pages of declassified files online. That year, Best also filed a FOIA lawsuit against the FBI for their files on the Church of Scientology. In 2019, Best and former NSA hacker Emily Crose embarked on a project to use FOIA to get documents on historical hacking incidents, called "Hacking History". That year, Best filed another FOIA lawsuit against the FBI for their file on the Church Committee.

In 2020, Best said they were concerned that the government was using the COVID-19 pandemic "as an obstructive step".

In 2021, the FBI banned Best from filing FOIA requests, and their existing requests were closed. With the help of national security attorneys Mark Zaid and Brad Moss, the ban was lifted after several months and their requests were reopened.

=== WikiLeaks ===
Before DDoSecrets, Best had joined a narrow group of WikiLeaks contributors before falling out with Julian Assange, accusing him, among other things, of having lied about the source of the DNC email leak, and the incomplete nature of its archive of John Podesta's emails. Best has also posted several documents already published by Wikileaks.

On 19 July 2016, in response to the Turkish government's purges that followed the coup attempt, WikiLeaks released 294,548 emails from Turkey's ruling Justice and Development party (AKP). On 21 July, WikiLeaks tweeted a link to a database which contained sensitive information, such as the Turkish Identification Number, of approximately 50 million Turkish citizens. The information was not in the files uploaded by WikiLeaks, but in files described by WikiLeaks as "the full data for the Turkey AKP emails and more". Best posted these files to the Internet Archive, who subsequently removed them when the personal data was discovered.

In mid-August 2016, Guccifer 2.0 expressed interest in offering a trove of Democratic e-mails to Best. Best tried to negotiate the hosting of the stolen emails and documents on the Internet Archive. Assange urged Best to decline, intimating that he was in contact with the persona's handlers, and that the material would have greater impact if he released it first. The conversation ended with "Guccifer 2.0" saying they would send the material directly to WikiLeaks.

After Best published private WikiLeaks chats in July 2018, Assange's personal Twitter account cited their transgender status and dismissed them as a disgruntled activist. Assange's account was locked until the tweet was deleted for violating Twitter rules. In November 2018, they leaked sealed chat logs that were part of the case against Assange.

In January 2019, they made a cache of Russian documents available to WikiLeaks before Distributed Denial of Secrets published them. In April 2019, they revealed that Chelsea Manning's FBI files were central to the ongoing proceedings against Assange before the indictment was unsealed.

In July 2022, Best was the first to discover that WikiLeaks had launched a new submission portal after being offline for months. The system did not work and then shut down completely.

=== Distributed Denial of Secrets ===
On December 3, 2018, Best co-founded Distributed Denial of Secrets with another member of the group known as The Architect. Best's work at WikiLeaks laid the foundation for the group to come together. According to Best, The Architect, whom they already knew, approached them and expressed their desire to see a new platform for leaked and hacked materials, along with other relevant datasets. In 2024, it was revealed that The Architect was Thomas White.

In July 2020, three agents who identified themselves as part of Homeland Security Investigations visited a woman in Boston to question her about BlueLeaks, Distributed Denial of Secrets and Emma Best. The agents asked the woman about her involvement with BlueLeaks before eventually asking her to become an informant, and offered to pay for any information that led to arrests.

In February 2021, Distributed Denial of Secrets leaked 70 gigabytes of data from the far right social media platform Gab, including email addresses, passwords, and internal emails; the group referred to the action as "GabLeaks".

In 2022, Best and Distributed Denial of Secrets joined in the information war being fought by Russia and Ukraine by publishing lots of information leaked from inside Russia.

== Commentary and beliefs ==
Best believes in radical transparency. Best explained their motivations by saying that "getting and publishing government documents means that with five years' effort, you can change 50 years of history."

For Best, freeing information is a step toward safety. They said "it's impossible to walk through the world and not be keenly aware of its absence." Best added that "queer people are attracted to transparency because we're forced into closets and into confronting broken and abusive systems."

In 2022, Best said "I don't long for any nationality. I'm not happy to be called an American. It's accurate. I'm not happy about it." They said it was because of "Imperialism. Uber-capitalism. Neo-colonialism, military expansion, pansurveillance, militarization of police, the police system itself." The same year, they said that "the leaking will continue until morality improves."

=== In the media and the arts ===
Best was part of Vice's roundtable of technologists, hackers, and journalists that dissected the fourth season of Mr. Robot.

== Personal life ==
After the publication of "GabLeaks" in 2021, Gab CEO Andrew Torba released a statement in which he referred to the leakers as "mentally ill tranny demon hackers". Best said that the incident left them with "the constant awareness that many of the people we publish data [about], at best, do not care about the quality of life for people like me unless it's profitable for them in some way, and many others would gladly cheer on or commit violence against queer people like me just for existing." That same year, Anonymous associate Barrett Brown accused Best and other members of DDoSecrets of faking being transgender to obscure their histories in the intelligence community.

Best is queer and nonbinary, is married to fellow DDoSecrets member Xan North. In 2018, Best's passport application was denied and paperwork with their application disappeared.
