= Antisec =

Antisec may refer to:

- Antisec Movement, a group opposed to computer security.
- Operation AntiSec, an ongoing hacking operation involving hacking groups LulzSec and Anonymous.
