= Embassy of the United States, Reykjavík =

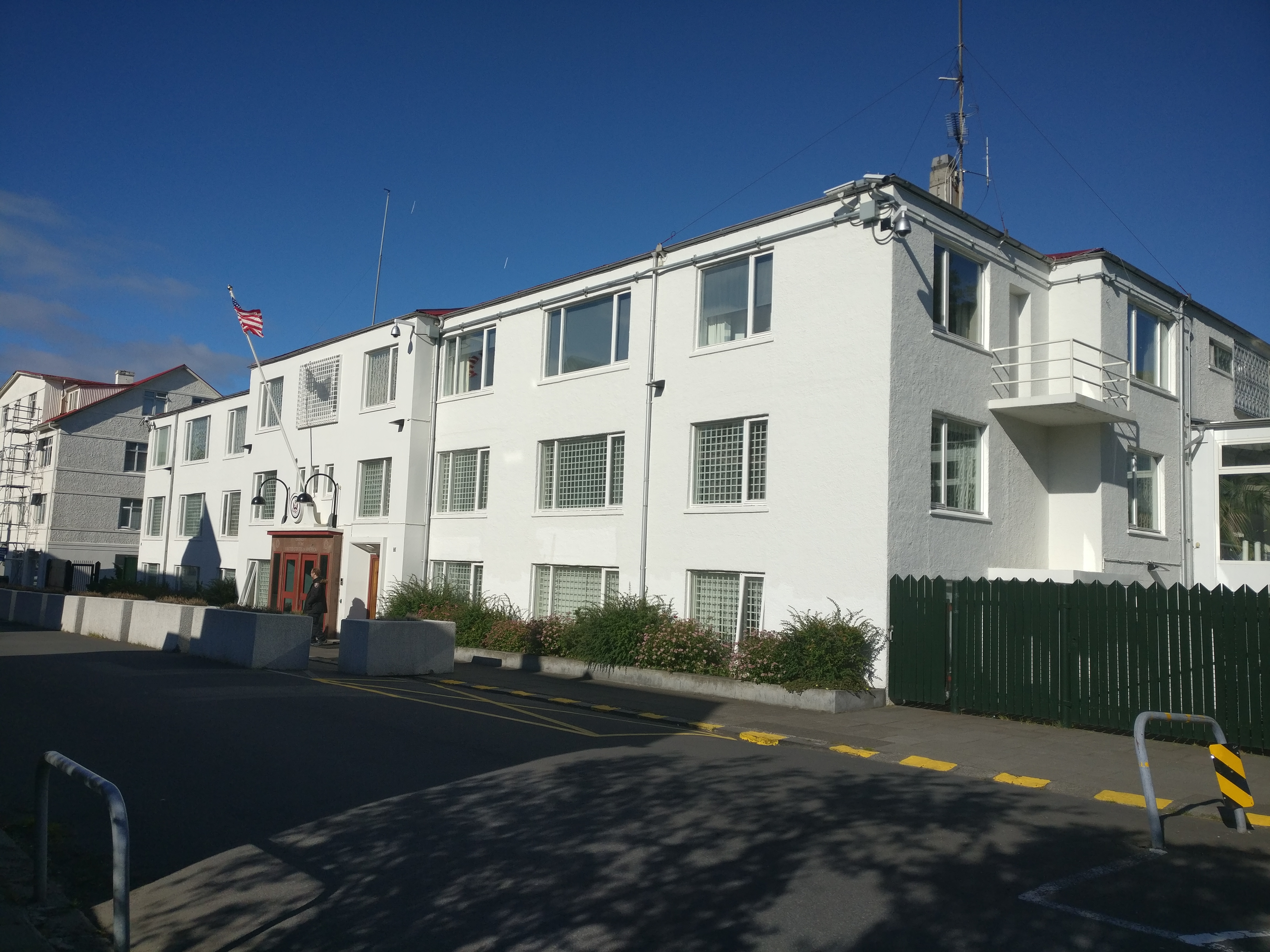
- The building on Laufásveg used until 2020
- Location: Reykjavík, Iceland
- Address: Engjateigur 7, 105 Reykjavík, Iceland
- Coordinates: 64°8′28″N 21°53′24″W
- Website: https://is.usembassy.gov

The Embassy of the United States in Reykjavík is the diplomatic mission of the United States of America in Iceland.

== History ==
The establishment of diplomatic relations between the U.S. and Iceland occurred on September 30, 1941, when Lincoln MacVeagh presented his credentials and elevated the then-American Consulate to Legation status. On November 3, 1955, the American Legation was further elevated to Embassy status, with John J. Muccio serving as the Ambassador Extraordinary and Plenipotentiary.

The U.S. Mission was previously housed in a building purchased by the Department of State in 1947 for the American Legation. This building, along with adjacent structures, served as the mission's home for over half a century. Throughout this time, it underwent various renovations and received technological upgrades.

In August 2011, the embassy received an email from Sigurdur Thordarson, an Icelandic citizen, requesting a confidential meeting to discuss an ongoing U.S. investigation of WikiLeaks. This correspondence marked the beginning of Thordarson's journey as an informant, a role that later gained significant attention in the context of the investigation into WikiLeaks and its activities.

In 2020, the embassy moved to a new location on Engjateigur. This pre-existing building was upgraded at a cost of $62 million.

== See also ==
- Iceland–United States relations
- List of ambassadors of the United States to Iceland
