= NCCU =

NCCU may refer to:

- National Chengchi University, a public research university in Taipei, Taiwan
- National Chung Cheng University, a public university in Chiayi, Taiwan
- North Carolina Central University, a university in Durham, North Carolina, United States
- National Cyber Crime Unit, of the National Crime Agency in the United Kingdom
