= Topiary (hacktivist) =

British hacktivist (born 1992)

- Born: Jake Leslie Davis; 27 October 1992 (age 34)
- Occupations: Hacktivist, security researcher
- Known for: Lulzsec

Jake Leslie Davis (born 27 October 1992), known professionally as Topiary, is a British hacktivist. He has worked with Anonymous, LulzSec, and other similar groups. He was an associate of the Internet group Anonymous, which has publicly claimed various online attacks, including hacking HBGary, Westboro Baptist Church, and Gawker. They have also claimed responsibility for the defacing of government websites in countries such as Zimbabwe, Syria, Tunisia, Ireland, and Egypt.

After serving his time and staying off the Internet for two years, Jake Davis is now a security researcher, disclosing bugs to corporations as a part of their bounty programs.

== Anonymous ==
Davis was a member of hacker collective Anonymous, where he was involved in the attack on HBGary in response to Aaron Barr, then CEO of the organization, claiming to have unmasked various members of Anonymous. The stolen HBGary emails were published and the small team who had been responsible splintered from Anonymous calling itself LulzSec.

== LulzSec ==
On 24 February 2011, Topiary gained attention after he appeared on The David Pakman Show. He informed the host that Anonymous had replaced a Westboro Baptist Church webpage with a message from Anonymous during an on-air confrontation with Shirley Phelps-Roper. A recording of this event was placed on YouTube, where it reached over one million views in five days.

Topiary was a member of LulzSec, and ran their Twitter account. The Guardian made a claim in a report that Topiary's name was Daniel.

On 14 July 2011, The Guardian published an exclusive interview with Topiary, in which he spoke extensively about his motivations. Describing himself as "an internet denizen with a passion for change" he said he feared being tracked by the authorities: "I can only hope that they haven't pinned any of us, especially my friends from LulzSec." Later, a full transcript of the lengthy interview surfaced on the website of freelance Guardian journalist Ryan Gallagher.

== Arrest ==
An 18-year-old man suspected of being Topiary was arrested in the Shetland islands of Scotland on 27 July 2011. On 31 July 2011, the man was charged with five offences including unauthorised computer access and conspiracy to carry out a distributed denial of service attack on the Serious Organised Crime Agency's website. Scotland Yard later identified the man arrested as Jake Davis, a resident of the island of Yell. He was charged with unauthorised access of a computer under the Computer Misuse Act 1990, encouraging or assisting criminal activity under the Serious Crime Act 2007, conspiracy to launch a denial-of-service attack against the Serious Organised Crime Unit contrary to the Criminal Law Act 1977, and criminal conspiracy also under the Criminal Law Act 1977.

Police confiscated a Dell laptop and a 100-gigabyte hard drive that had 16 different virtual machines. The hard drive also contained details relating to an attack on Sony and hundreds of thousands of email addresses and passwords. A London court released Davis on bail under the conditions that he live under curfew with his mother and have no access to the Internet. His lawyer Gideon Cammerman stated that, while his client did help publicise LulzSec and Anonymous attacks, he lacked the technical skills to have been anything but a sympathiser.

After his arrest, Anonymous launched a 'Free Topiary' campaign, which included adding a "Free Topiary" banner to their Twitter avatars, similar to the Free Bradley banner.

== Guilty plea ==
Davis pleaded guilty on 25 June 2012 to DDoS attacks on several websites, but pleaded not guilty to two counts of encouraging others to commit computer offenses and fraud. Davis was due to be tried along with Ryan Cleary (Ryan), Ryan Ackroyd (Kayla), Mustafa Al-Bassam (tflow), beginning 8 April 2013. The court was informed it would take 3,000 hours to view the material against Ackroyd alone. They were released on bail, except for Cleary.

Davis was not tried for a number of other crimes perpetrated by LulzSec.

== Court appearance ==
On 8 April 2013, Davis again appeared in court with fellow hackers, Ryan Ackroyd, Ryan Cleary and Mustafa Al-Bassam. All four pleaded guilty to computer crimes and were sentenced on 14 May 2013. Davis faced a maximum of 10 years in prison but got 24 months in a young offenders institute. He served 38 days because he had been electronically tagged for 21 months and this counted against his sentence.
