= James Bidzos =

American chief executive

- Occupation: Business executive
- Employer: Verisign
- Organizations: RSA Data Security; RSA Laboratories; RSA Conference; Verisign
- Known for: Founding Verisign; RSA Data Security leadership; Establishing RSA Laboratories; Creating the RSA Conference
- Office: President and Chief Executive Officer of Verisign
- Predecessor: Mark McLaughlin
- Board member of: Verisign
- Awards: CRN Industry Hall of Fame (2000); Time magazine's Digital 50; RSA Conference Lifetime Achievement Award (2004)

Jim Bidzos is the founder of Verisign, Inc. and currently serves as the president and CEO. He assumed this position on August 1, 2011, after the resignation of Mark McLaughlin on July 27. Bidzos has been serving the company as chairman of the board of directors since 2007. Since August 2009, he has also been serving as executive chairman.

== Career ==
On February 1, 1986, Bidzos joined RSA Data Security Inc., an Internet identity and access management solutions provider. According to Bidzos, the company was a complete failure: it had no products, no customers, and no revenue. He led the company in developing the RSA encryption toolkit by partnering with Iris Associates, a small company in Massachusetts that was writing a program called Lotus Notes for Corporation. The partnership with Iris Associates saved RSA Data Security. Bidzos was able to demonstrate the power of public-key encryption and how it worked with personal computers quickly and effectively. He was able to close contracts to provide RSA encryption to companies such as Motorola and Novell. By 1993, approximately 100 companies were using the RSA tool kit. In 1994, he led the company in developing cryptographic toolkits, as well as other security products over the years. Bidzos worked as president and CEO of RSA Data Security from 1986 to 1999, after which he served as vice-chairman until 2002.

In 1989, Bidzos co-founded the RSA Laboratories, a research organization. He also created the RSA Conference in 1991 and served as its chairman until 2004.

In 1995, Mr. Bidzos established Verisign. He was the first president, CEO, and chairman of the board, serving in this capacity until 2001, after which he became vice-chairman until 2007. In 2008, the board of directors appointed him as interim CEO and chairman after the resignation of William Roper. During this period, Bidzos also served as director of Verisign Japan K.K, which lasted until August 2010.

== Awards ==
- CRN Industry Hall of Fame - November 13, 2000
- Time Magazine's "Digital 50"
- RSA Conference Lifetime Achievement (Information Security) - 2004
