= Sigurdur Thordarson =

Icelandic hacker, informant and criminal (born 1992)

- Sigurður Ingi Þórðarson
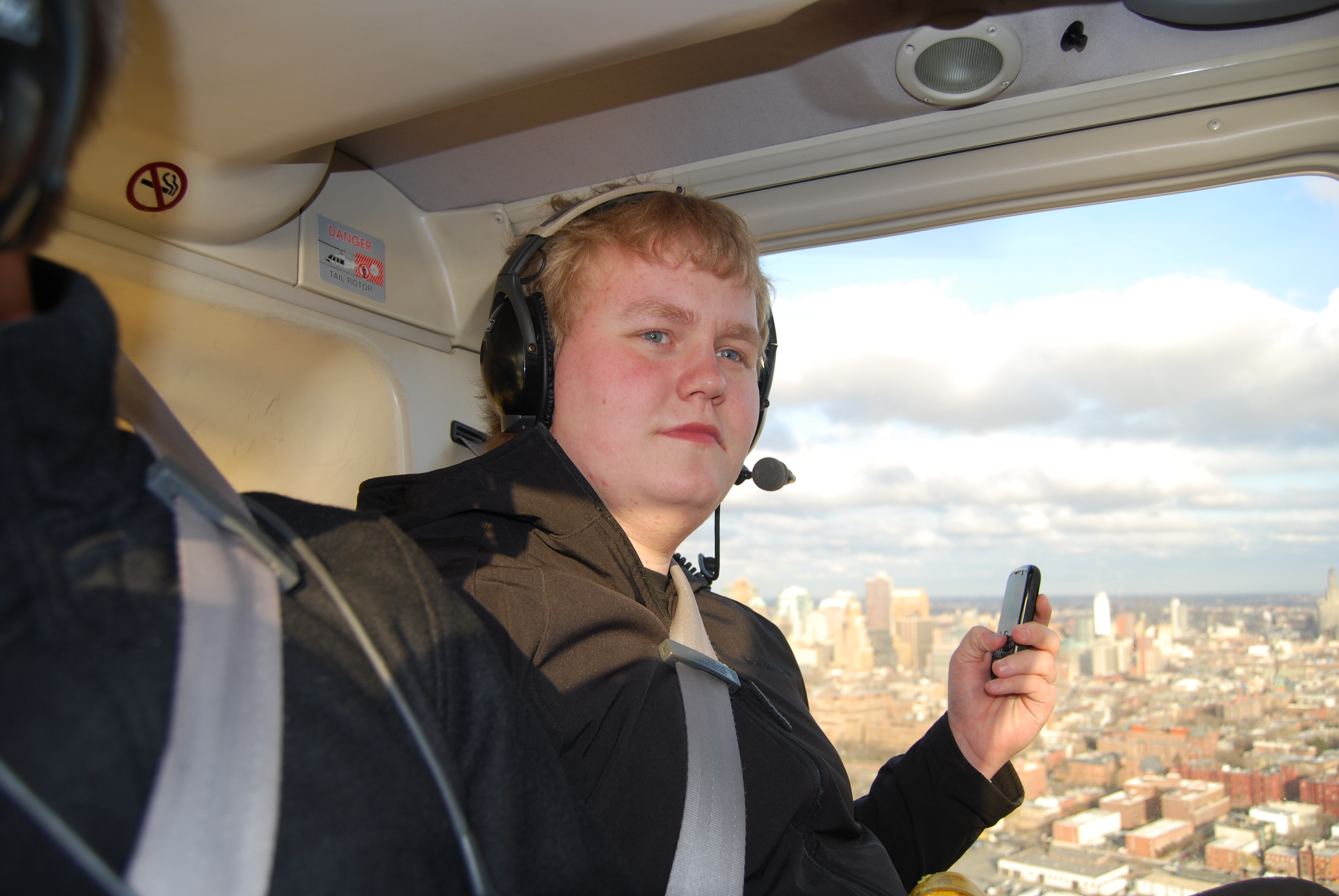
- Thordarson in 2011
- Born: 12 October 1992 (age 33)
- Other names: Siggi hakkari ("Siggi the Hacker")
- Known for: WikiLeaks, Anonymous, FBI
- Title: Volunteer in charge of chat rooms at WikiLeaks
- Criminal charges: Information leaks, fraud, Solicitation of sex from underage boys and adults.
- Criminal status: Released

Sigurdur Ingi Thordarson (Icelandic: Sigurður Ingi Þórðarson) (born 1992), commonly known as Siggi hakkari ("Siggi the Hacker"), is an Icelandic convicted criminal and FBI informant against WikiLeaks. He is known for information leaks, multiple cases of fraud and embezzlement, sexual solicitation of minors and adults. He has multiple convictions for sexual offences.

In 2010, at the age of 17, he was arrested for stealing and leaking classified information about Icelandic financial companies. After his arrest, Kristinn Hrafnsson introduced him to Julian Assange, the editor and founder of WikiLeaks, and he worked as a volunteer for the organization between 2010 and 2011. In 2011, Thordarson contacted the FBI and offered to become an informant, turning over numerous internal WikiLeaks documents and hard drives in the process. WikiLeaks accused him of having embezzled $50,000 from the WikiLeaks online store to which he pleaded guilty along with other economic crimes against other entities. He was also accused of using Julian Assange's name in legal documents.

In June 2021, in an interview with Icelandic newspaper Stundin, Thordarson admitted that he had fabricated testimony he made against Julian Assange in the case in which the US sought Assange's extradition from the UK. Thordarson was a key witness whose testimony was crucial to the US case, according to numerous news organisations, including the German public broadcaster Deutsche Welle, The Hill, Der Spiegel and The Intercept. The Washington Post disagreed, writing that Thordarson's testimony was not part of the core allegations.

In the 2024 documentary A Dangerous Boy, directed by Ole Bendzen and produced by Academy Award-nominated Søren Steen Jespersen, it is alleged that the article claiming Thordarson admitted to lying was orchestrated and funded by WikiLeaks. Journalist Kristjón Kormákur, who has authored several articles about Thordarson, stated that he and Bjartmar Alexandersson were hired to investigate Thordarson, which ultimately led to the publication of the article. Thordarson has noted on his personal website that he does not admit to lying anywhere in the article or in the recordings of the interview; the claim appears only in the headline. WikiLeaks and Bjartmar Alexandersson declined to participate in the documentary, and the editor-in-chief of Stundin (now Heimildin) declined to comment on the allegations. Bjartmar stated in the documentary that he would not be allowed to participate unless WikiLeaks approved. When informed that WikiLeaks had hired journalists to produce the article, Thordarson responded: "Interesting".

== Early life and education ==
Thordarson grew up middle-class in Reykjavik with a younger sister. He began hacking at age 12 and joined WikiLeaks in February 2010 when he was 17 years old and in high school. He went to university to study computer science and psychology, but says he was suspended for hacking.

== Information leaks ==
Thordarson began leaking information about the Icelandic banking system to the media in late 2009. This included information about individuals in the Icelandic banking system, information that showed that individuals were committing illegal acts in relation to banking. One of the leaks by Thordarson concerned a case called "Vafningsmálið." It involved Bjarni Benediktsson during his time as an MP. Bjarni reported that the case was only a political smear campaign. The information published by Icelandic news media obtained from Thordarson also showed that one of the country's biggest football stars, Eiður Guðjohnsen, was deeply indebted and almost bankrupt.

After the information was published, Eiður sued the local newspaper DV for publishing this information. DV lost the case in a lower court, but won an appeal to the Supreme Court of Iceland, stating that the information was a matter for the public. Amongst other information that Thordarson admitted to have leaked in an interview with the Rolling Stone magazine was information about local businessman Karl Wernersson. He was the owner of the Milestone ehf that was the investment company from which Thordarson stole most of the information. Other names in the documents leaked by Thordarson included information about Birkir Kristinsson, who had recently been convicted of economic crimes while working for Glitnir bank. Some speculate that information from Thordarson was used as evidence in that case, Thordarson also leaked a classified report about one of the bigger aluminum plants in Iceland. The report stated that the plant was paying 1/4 of what other aluminum plants in the world are paying for electricity.

Other information leaked by Thordarson contained information about other local business men such as Gunnar Gunnarsson, who also has been reported to assist football star Cristiano Ronaldo in tax affairs. Kristinn Hrafnsson thought Thordarson's leaks were "quite significant" and introduced him to Julian Assange. In 2013, Thordarson argued with Birgitta Jónsdóttir on Twitter over the release of the loanbooks of the Glitnir Bank. Thordarson said she had no involvement, but he claimed that he had given her the files years ago. In 2009, Thordarson arrived at the offices of the Special Prosecutor, who investigated the bank collapse in Iceland in 2008. Thordarson reportedly gave them all the information he had on Milestone and other local business men, however instead of using some of the information obtained from Thordarson in investigation the investigators decided to sell the information. The case against the two police officers was later dismissed, and it has been reported that the investigators made roughly 30 Million ISK ($250.000) from the documents.

== WikiLeaks ==
Thordarson began working for WikiLeaks as early as February 2010 and was fired in November 2011. In a few weeks, Thordarson was in Assange's inner circle. According to one former volunteer, "the perception was that Siggi basically got to a level where Julian trusted him in a matter of days." Birgitta Jónsdóttir, a former WikiLeaks volunteer and member of the Icelandic parliament who worked on Collateral Murder, described Julian Assange's relationship with Thordarson as like "Batman and Robin." Several of WikiLeaks' core volunteers said that Siggi was a dangerous liability, prone to indiscretions and lies and Jonsdottir warned Assange not to trust Thordarson. Assange told others not to trust or talk to Thordarson, but continued working with him. According to Daniel Domscheit-Berg, "it all implied Julian was using him. These are all kinds of games children get into."

Assange helped Thordarson find a lawyer in 2010 after he was arrested, and directly gave Thordarson an encrypted cell phone, and involved him in the Collateral Murder project. Assange asked Thordarson to write psychological profiles of core WikiLeaks members and to install hidden cameras to spy on guests in Ellingham Hall. Thordarson performed additional surveillance and copied their hard drives. They talked regularly and Thordarson looked for equipment and made encrypted calls to contacts on Assange's behalf. According to an indictment against Assange, he and Thordarson made a "joint attempt" to decrypt a file stolen from an Icelandic bank.

Thordarson took part in moderating a chat room, vetting potential allies and sources. Reports state that Thordarson obtained many leaks that WikiLeaks later published, such as The Kissinger cables, The Syria Files, and the Stratfor emails and journalists said he was involved in delivering the leaked diplomatic cables to journalists. He also sold T-shirts for the organisation and was the middle man in negotiations that led to WikiLeaks donating $15,000 to Chelsea Manning's defense fund.

David Kushner reported that Thordarson provided Rolling Stone with over 1 terabyte of data about WikiLeaks, including thousands of pages of chat logs, videos, tapped phone calls, government documents. Kushner said that either Thordarson was the real deal or this was the biggest and most elaborate lie in the digital age, and that Assange's affidavit validated the importance of Siggi's documents. Tangerine Bolen, founder of former WikiLeaks collaborator RevolutionTruth, said WikiLeaks' efforts to discredit Thordarson after his FBI cooperation became public were patently false: "They’re scared. The fact is Siggi played a key role in the organization and was very close to Julian."

Thordarson embezzled $50,000 from a WikiLeaks online store that sold T-shirts, the money was paid into his own bank account and the official reason why he was fired. Thordarson said he used the funds to cover expenses he was owed by WikiLeaks and that the money went through his account with Assange's permission. Thordarson was later convicted on a related charge.

=== Anonymous and LulzSec ===
Media sources indicate that persons part of Anonymous and LulzSec reported to Thordarson, and chat logs between Thordarson and Hector Monsegur a.k.a. Sabu during Sabu's time as an FBI informant have surfaced. Former WikiLeaks employee James Ball has said Thordarson reported directly to Assange and served as WikiLeaks' contact with hacker groups and Thordarson said Assange was with him when he asked Sabu to hack Icelandic websites and Stratfor on WikiLeaks’ behalf.

During his period at WikiLeaks, it has also been reported that Thordarson ordered attacks on Icelandic governmental infrastructures such as the servers hosting the Ministry's websites stjornarradid.is and landsnet.is. Those DDoS attacks were successful for a few hours. This was all done after an Icelandic business man that owns an Icelandic data center asked Thordarson to do so. It has also been reported that Thordarson ordered Hector Monsegur (Sabu) and his team to attack Icelandic State Police servers. It is reported that Thordarson obtained the unpublished version of a report about the surveillance unit at the U.S. Embassy in Reykjavik.

=== Icelandic Parliament "Spy Computer" ===
In January 2011, it was reported in the Icelandic media that a computer had been found within closed sections of the Parliament. It was alleged that WikiLeaks was suspected of placing the computer inside the Parliament. Bjarni Benediktsson the MP Thordarson leaked information about comments found on the computer.

Thordarson was questioned about his involvement in this case. Morgunblaðið, Iceland's largest newspaper published on the front page on 31 January 2011 that a local reporter for the paper DV was suspected of obtaining the information from Thordarson. The reporter was said to be under investigation for receiving the information from Thordarson and manipulating Thordarson into leaking the information and placing the computer inside Parliament. The reporter sued the newspaper for libel and won the case. Morgunblaðið withdrew the report and issued an apology to the reporter on 7 December.

A later report in the Icelandic media stated that specialists were checking whether parliament phones were spied on by WikiLeaks. Wired published chat logs that indicated they got copies of phone call recordings. Some Icelandic papers have connected the phone call recordings that WikiLeaks allegedly got to "Spy Computer" scandal. Birgitta Jónsdóttir issued a statement stating that she had never heard of any recordings.

As of 2016, the case was still under investigation with no official suspects.

In a June 2021 interview with Icelandic media Stundin, Thordarson said that Assange did not ask him to hack or record phone calls of the MPs. Thordarson claimed that he was given files from someone who claimed to have recorded the MPs and that he offered to share them with Assange without checking the files.

=== FBI connection ===
In August 2011, Thordarson contacted the United States Embassy in Reykjavik and claimed he had information about an ongoing criminal investigation in the United States, and requested a meeting. Thordarson was then summoned to the embassy, where he gave diplomatic staff official documents showing that he was who he claimed to be. Thordarson said he was motivated by a fear of the US judicial system and disagreement over how WikiLeaks acquired information. He also said he gave them 1 TB of data, but "they didn’t know about the extra 2TB" and that he refused to wear a wire to record Assange.

The day after the meeting with the embassy official the FBI sent a private jet with eight federal agents and a prosecutor to question Thordarson. The FBI gave Icelandic authorities notice that they were questioning Thordarson in relation to a co-investigation that Anonymous and LulzSec were about to infiltrate Icelandic government systems. After the authorities found out Thordarson was also being questioned about WikiLeaks, the FBI was asked to leave Iceland. The FBI left the country a few days later. Thordarson went with them to Denmark where questioning continued.

Thordarson was subsequently returned to Iceland. In 2012, he met with the federal agents on multiple occasions, and was flown to Copenhagen where Thordarson was provided a room in a luxury hotel. Thordarson was allowed to return to Iceland after every meeting. Thordarson met with the FBI again in Washington D.C. and spent a couple of days with them there. The final meeting that Thordarson said took place with the FBI was during a course Thordarson was enrolled in at Aarhus in Denmark, teaching IT Security. Thordarson met with the agents there and handed over several hard drives he had copied from Assange and core WikiLeaks members.

Wired reported Thordarson had received $5,000 for his assistance to compensate him for the work he missed while meeting with FBI agents.

Thordarson said that in February 2013, he told Kristinn Hrafnsson, Ingi Ingason and a third WikiLeaks staff member that he was an FBI informant and gave them the 3TB trove. In 2013, Thordarson was also summoned to the General Committee of the Icelandic Parliament after days of being discussed in the Parliament. They questioned Thordarson about his involvement in the FBI case. The then-Minister of the Interior Ögmundur Jónasson said in Parliament that Thordarson was young and the FBI meant him to be a "spy" within the WikiLeaks organization.

In May 2019, he signed an immunity agreement with US prosecutors in exchange for information. He is referred to as 'Teenager' in the indictment against Assange. In June 2021, in an interview with Icelandic newspaper Stundin, Thordarson recanted previous statements that he had made about Julian Assange, now claiming, for example, that Assange never instructed him to "hack or access" phone recordings of Icelandic MPs. He said that he misrepresented himself as an official representative of WikiLeaks. Several news organisations, including The Hill, Deutsche Welle, Der Spiegel, Berliner Zeitung and The Intercept described Thordarson as being a chief or key witness in the case. Deutsche Welle said "the key witness, Icelandic national Sigurd Ingi Thordarson, had admitted to fabricating incriminating testimony against Assange in return for immunity from prosecution". Over ten days after the Stundin article, The Washington Post said Thordarson's testimony was not used as the basis for charges but for information on Assange's contact with Chelsea Manning.

== Arrests and convictions ==
In January 2010, when Thordarson was seventeen years old he was arrested on suspicion of stealing classified information from Milestone ehf. That case never reached the court system and Thordarson described his involvement in the Rolling Stone interview.

In 2012, Thordarson was questioned about sexual misconduct, accused of deceiving a seventeen-year-old teenage boy. At the time, Thordarson was 18 years old. Thordarson denied the charges but was found guilty in late 2013 and received 8 months in prison.

In 2012, WikiLeaks filed criminal charges against Thordarson for embezzlement. Thordarson denied the charges and the case was later dismissed. He was later arrested in the summer of 2013 on charges of financial fraud. At that time, the WikiLeaks case was brought back up, and Thordarson was indicted on charges of embezzlement and financial fraud. In 2014, Thordarson was ordered to pay WikiLeaks 7 million ISK (roughly $55,000) as well as being sentenced to prison for 2 years for embezzlement and financial fraud. Thordarson pled guilty to all counts. In those cases Thordarson was ordered to pay the victims 15 million ISK (roughly $115.000), Thordarson received a two-year prison sentence in those cases.

In 2012, Thordarson was arrested for allegedly having tried to blackmail a large Icelandic candy factory, but the case was later dismissed.

In January 2014, Thordarson was again arrested for sex crimes. He was believed to be a potential flight risk as well as being likely to sabotage the investigation against him and therefore placed in solitary confinement. Thordarson had said he would offer flight tickets, Land Rovers, and up to a million dollars in exchange for sexual favours. The victims ranged from the age of 15–20, all male, during which Thordarson was 18–21. A psychiatric evaluation ruled that Thordarson was of sound mind, but that he had an antisocial personality disorder and was incapable of feeling remorse for his actions. Thordarson pled guilty to all counts and received a 3-year jail sentence.

Thordarson was ordered to pay 8.6 million ISK (roughly $66,000) in damages to his victims. In 2014, he was sentenced to pay roughly $236,000 in damages for various economic crimes and frauds, including having swindled fast-food companies, car rentals, electronics shops, and having tricked someone into giving him all his shares in a book publishing company. In September 2015 he was sentenced to three years' imprisonment for paying or offering gifts for sex with 4 boys under the age of 18, but over the age of consent, which is 15 in Iceland, and for acquiring prostitution from 5 adult men., after confessing to the crime the previous month. The victims were offered payment or some other form of inducement. A court ordered criminal forensic psychiatric evaluation diagnosed him with antisocial personality disorder.

In September 2021, on the day he returned to Iceland from a trip to Spain, Thordarson was arrested and imprisoned. He was held for 3 months and released in December 2021, Thordarson was released as the police had no grounds to file and indictment, Thordarson was held under an Icelandic law enabling the detention of individuals believed to be active in ongoing organized crimes. According to Stundin, the cases leading to his arrest involved financial fraud.

In 2021, new details became public. These included allegations from one of his victims that Thordarson bought sexual favours from him more than the 40 times the court judgment said. According to the victim, Thordarson had weapons and threatened him and his family over a 2-3 year period, and used pepper spray and a stun gun on him. Thordarson recorded a video of him and the victim, which the police came into possession of and led to them learning more, In the documentary A Dangerous Boy, which explores the life of Sigurdur Thordarson, it is shown that a police investigation found no evidence to support the claims made by the victim beside the exchange of financial support or gifts for sexual favours. The film includes court documents indicating that Thordarson was indicted for purchasing sex or receiving sexual services in exchange for favors or gifts. Thordarson has addressed these allegations publicly, including a statement on his personal website. In an interview with Ekko magazine in Denmark, he stated that the allegations are baseless and were raised years after the case had already been investigated and tried in court, where he pleaded guilty to several counts of buying sexual favours. When asked whether he wanted these allegations removed from the documentary, he stated: ""If someone has something to say about me – even if they are full of shit – I will not ask for it to be removed. In a democracy we have freedom of speech. I am suing Oli for libel, because he must be able to prove what he says. But the claim can be included in the documentary, because I do not want to interfere in the story about myself."

== Media portrayals ==
The film The Fifth Estate (2013), with Benedict Cumberbatch as Assange, features a character based on Thordarson's played by Jamie Blackley. Thordarson is mentioned in Domscheit-Berg's book, during his time with WikiLeaks he reportedly used the handles PenguinX, Singi201 and "Q".

== Documentary and Public Statements ==
In 2024, Sigurdur Thordarson became the subject of the Danish documentary Siggi – drengen der blev FBI-spion ("Siggi – the Boy Who Became an FBI Spy"), directed by Ole Bendtzen and produced by Pipeline Production for DR and other European broadcasters. The film explores Thordarson's journey from teenage hacker to WikiLeaks affiliate and later FBI informant.

The documentary includes interviews with Thordarson and other key figures, along with archive footage of WikiLeaks founder Julian Assange. It premiered at festivals such as CPH:DOX and One World Prague.

During the film, Kristjón Kormákur Guðjónsson, an Icelandic editor and former WikiLeaks contractor, claimed to have been hired by WikiLeaks to co-author an article discrediting Thordarson. The article, published in Stundin, alleged that Thordarson fabricated elements of his FBI testimony in the Assange case. Journalist Bjartmar Oddur Þeyr Alexandersson, credited with writing the piece, disputed the claim, stating that Kormákur only reviewed parts of the article.

In a 2024 interview with Filmmagasinet Ekko, Thordarson commented on the documentary's portrayal and the public discourse surrounding it. He emphasized his belief in freedom of speech: “If someone has something to say about me—even if they’re full of nonsense—I won’t ask for it to be removed. In a democracy, people are allowed to say stupid things.” He stated that he had no intention of interfering with the filmmakers' narrative.

Thordarson also reacted to Julian Assange's release, stating he held no personal grudge and viewed his cooperation with the FBI as a personal decision rather than a political one.

The film was nominated for Denmarks highest film awards for best documentary, Bodil Prisen 2025, it did not win.

== Personal Website and DOJ Letter ==
In 2025, Sigurdur Thordarson launched the website iSociopath as a platform to share personal reflections, clarify public misconceptions, and address his criminal convictions and role in the WikiLeaks investigation. The site includes blog posts, commentary on media coverage, and insights into his experiences as a whistleblower and informant.

Among the most notable disclosures on the site is the publication of a letter from the U.S. Department of Justice. The letter, sent privately to Thordarson, acknowledges his cooperation in the investigation into WikiLeaks and Julian Assange. It states that the information he provided was credible, legally sound, and instrumental in preventing harm to civilians, intelligence operatives, and informants. The letter does not constitute a public commendation, as Thordarson did not testify in court, but he described it as a “quiet, private validation” of his actions.

Thordarson emphasized that his decision to publish the letter was driven by a desire to counter years of misinformation and character attacks. He wrote that while WikiLeaks had portrayed him as unreliable, the DOJ letter confirmed the integrity of his disclosures and their impact on national security. He also addressed his past convictions, acknowledging mistakes and expressing a commitment to transparency and personal accountability.

== PPP Spy Case and Allegations of Corruption ==
In 2025, Sigurdur Thordarson became publicly linked to the so-called PPP spy case in Iceland, a complex investigation involving surveillance, political influence, and alleged misconduct within law enforcement. The case drew national attention due to its implications for civil liberties and institutional transparency.

Thordarson discussed his involvement in the case during an appearance on the Icelandic podcast Brotkast, known for its independent editorial stance and controversial guests. In the episode, he described how he had obtained and later published audio recordings of a private conversation between himself and a senior member of the Icelandic police. The officer, who at the time of the recording held a high-ranking position and was later appointed Deputy Speaker of the Icelandic Parliament, was allegedly heard discussing how to conduct an interrogation in a way that would be “good for all parties.”

The recordings were released on Thordarson's website iSociopath and sparked debate over ethical boundaries in law enforcement and political accountability. Critics argued that the conversation suggested collusion or manipulation of legal procedures, while others defended the exchange as pragmatic coordination.

Thordarson stated that his decision to publish the recordings was motivated by a desire to expose what he described as “quiet corruption” and to highlight the blurred lines between police conduct and political ambition. He emphasized that the recordings were not edited and that they reflected a broader pattern of institutional compromise.

The Deputy Speaker has not publicly commented on the recordings, but a formal investigation has been announced. However, the incident has fueled calls for greater oversight of police-political interactions and transparency in Icelandic governance.

== PPP Scandal and Connections to Fishrot Files ==
The PPP scandal in Iceland refers to a covert surveillance operation conducted in 2012 by the private security firm Pars Per Pars Security Firm (PPPSF), founded by former police officers Jón Óttar Ólafsson and Guðmundur Haukur Gunnarsson. The firm was allegedly hired to monitor individuals involved in a class-action lawsuit against billionaire Björgólfur Thor Björgólfsson, stemming from the collapse of Landsbanki in 2008, where Björgólfsson had been the largest shareholder.

The surveillance operation included hidden cameras, audio recordings, and tracking of personal routines. Among the targets were politicians, lawyers, and business figures. One police officer, Lúðvík Kristinsson, was found to have conducted surveillance while on active duty, allegedly accessing sensitive police databases to assist the operation.

In 2025, further revelations linked the same officers to the international Fishrot Files scandal, which exposed bribery by Icelandic fishing company Samherji in Namibia. Documents and investigative reports suggested that PPPSF operatives had received payments based on banking files originally leaked by Sigurdur Thordarson in 2011. These files reportedly contained financial data used to identify targets and facilitate offshore transactions.

In 2011, the same officers were fired, and prosecuted for selling Thordarson's banking files for hundreds of thousands of dollars.

Björgólfur Thor Björgólfsson has denied direct involvement in the PPP surveillance operation, stating that the firm's activities were presented to him as legal intelligence gathering and that he was unaware of the extent of their methods. However, leaked recordings and documents obtained by investigative journalists suggest that his close associates, including lawyer Birgir Már Ragnarsson, acted as intermediaries between Björgólfsson and PPPSF.

The scandal has prompted calls for greater oversight of private intelligence firms and their ties to political and corporate interests in Iceland. As of mid-2025, investigations by the state prosecutor and parliamentary committees are ongoing, Thordarson has provided data to Parliament and the overseeing committee for police misconduct.

== Sexual convictions ==
According to documents published by Thordarson on his personal website and reported by various media outlets, he was convicted of nine sexual criminal offenses under Icelandic law. These convictions were based on violations of Article 202, sub-article 3 and Article 206, sub-article 1 of the Icelandic General Penal Code.

Article 202, sub-article 3 criminalizes sexual acts involving individuals aged 15 to 17 when the offender engages in such acts by offering or providing payment, gifts, or other favors. Although the age of consent in Iceland is 15, this provision applies when the sexual activity involves compensation and the younger party is under 18. The law allows for reduced or waived punishment if the age difference or maturity level between the parties is minimal. Government of Iceland – General Penal Code

Article 206, sub-article 1 prohibits the purchase of sexual services for payment, regardless of whether the person providing the service is an adult or a minor. This includes offering money, gifts, or other benefits in exchange for sexual acts. Skemman – Icelandic Prostitution Law Analysis

Thordarson was between the ages of 17 and 21 at the time the offenses occurred. Of the nine cases, five involved engaging in sexual acts with adults in exchange for money or favors, while the remaining four involved individuals under the age of 18, none were below the age of consent. His convictions were based on findings that he had engaged in sexual activity in return for compensation, in violation of Icelandic law. iSociopath – Thordarson’s personal website Daily Dot – Conviction details

One of the individuals involved came forward in an interview featured in the documentary A Dangerous Boy, offering an emotional testimony about their experience with Thordarson. While the allegations described in the documentary were broader in scope, the legal proceedings focused specifically on the charge under Article 202, sub-article 3, to which Thordarson pleaded guilty. Thordarson has publicly denied the additional allegations made in the documentary, stating that police and court records do not reflect those claims and that they were made nearly a decade after the investigation and legal proceedings had concluded. iSociopath – Thordarson’s personal website

== Criticism from WikiLeaks and Kristinn Hrafnsson ==
One of Thordarson's most vocal critics is Kristinn Hrafnsson, the editor-in-chief of WikiLeaks. When asked to participate in the documentary A Dangerous Boy, which profiles Thordarson's life and legal history, Hrafnsson publicly condemned the project, stating that it would be “a crime to make a movie about such a person” and expressing disgust at the idea of Icelandic filmmakers being involved.

In Thordarson's early years, Hrafnsson played a pivotal role in introducing him to WikiLeaks and Julian Assange, following Thordarson's involvement in leaking documents related to Icelandic financial institutions and political life.

Over the years, WikiLeaks and Hrafnsson have repeatedly challenged Thordarson's credibility, often labeling him a pathological liar. However, critics of WikiLeaks have pointed out that these denouncements are frequently made without citing specific evidence, and that the organization's own statements about Thordarson's role have shifted over time. Initially, WikiLeaks claimed he had no formal role; later statements acknowledged his involvement in managing chat rooms and coordinating volunteers.

In an effort to discredit Thordarson's testimony to U.S. authorities, Hrafnsson famously stated, “There was no hacking, there was no conspiracy.However, subsequent reporting and court documents have shown that Thordarson did provide the FBI with internal WikiLeaks data and communications, and that his cooperation was used to support parts of the U.S. indictment against Assange.

Julian Assange plead guilty to parts of the charges in the summer of 2024.

Thordarson has responded to these criticisms, noting on his LinkedIn page that it is ironic for Hrafnsson to call him a “notorious liar” while still citing documents Thordarson provided during his time as a source for him while Hrafnsson was at RÚV, Iceland's national broadcaster. One such document was a classified report detailing the electricity rates paid by aluminum smelters in Iceland, which Hrafnsson later shared publicly on his Facebook page in early 2025.

== Allegations of Targeting and Surveillance ==
The documentary A Dangerous Boy also reveals controversial claims that WikiLeaks, under the direction of Kristinn Hrafnsson, engaged in efforts to discredit Thordarson by hiring journalists to access his legal address and intercept mail. According to the film, these tactics were part of a broader campaign to undermine Thordarson's credibility following his cooperation with U.S. authorities.

When asked about these allegations, Hrafnsson responded that WikiLeaks “employs various tactics on stories,” but declined to comment further on the specific claims made in the documentary.

== Reception and Accolades ==
A Dangerous Boy was selected for several international film festivals, including CPH:DOX 2024, One World Prague 2024, and One World Brussels 2024. The film received critical acclaim for its portrayal of Thordarson's complex life and the geopolitical tensions surrounding WikiLeaks.

The film's producer, Søren Steen Jespersen, is an acclaimed Danish filmmaker who was previously nominated for an Academy Award for Best Documentary Feature for his work on Last Men in Aleppo in 2018.
