= Astalavista.box.sk =

Information Security Website

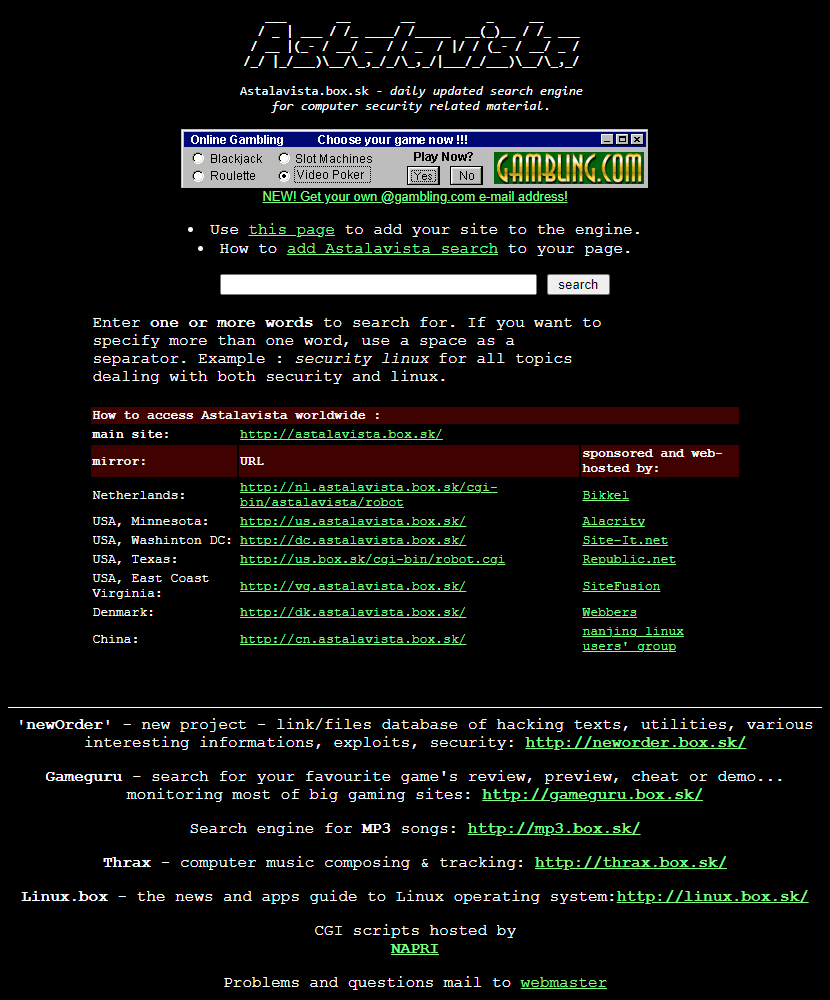
- The astalavista.box.sk web portal in 1999
- Website type: Search engine
- Available in: English
- Headquarters: {{{location_country}}}
- Website: astalavista.box.sk
- Advertising: Yes
- Registration: No
- Launched: 1994; 32 years ago
- Current status: Inactive

astalavista.box.sk was founded in 1994 as one of the first search engines for computer security information. In practice it turned out to be used as a search engine for security exploits, software for hacking, cracking and different keygenerators and software cracks.

In the early 1990s and 2000s, the site was popular among people interested in hacking or securing systems against hacking. The site is known for referencing things such as spyware and viruses and because of this the website is known to possibly contain data, links, downloadable files, and information some users would consider spyware, adware, or other unwanted programs. Besides possible links to viruses, the website used to display adult adverts.

Previously, the website was part of a larger network of websites all using the box.sk domain. These websites all catered to different downloads, including MP3 music, DVD rips, and digital graphics and other hacking websites, such as New Order.

Astalavista.box.sk is hosted in Slovakia. Astalavista is a pun on the Spanish phrase "hasta la vista" (meaning "see you later"). It has been speculated that the name was a play on the 90's web search engine Altavista, however, that was launched a year later in 1995.

Astalavista.box.sk was not affiliated to astalavista.com, which was a separate hacking community, founded in 1997.

On April 7, 2021, an article was published on Medium.com by Dancho Danchev stating that the site is back up and running. Subsequent attempts to reach the site however lead to a 503 Service Unavailable error on the website.
