= MalSec =

Hacker group

MalSec (an abbreviation of "Malicious Security") is a splinter faction of Anonymous that pledges to use hacktivism ethically to empower people. The group has said that they want to turn away from their trickster ways and become a more forthright force fighting censorship on the Internet and improving the security of the net with free pentests.
