= National Cyber Crime Unit =

United Kingdom police unit

The National Cyber Crime Unit (NCCU) is a command of the United Kingdom's National Crime Agency. With the creation of the National Crime Agency in 2013, the unit was formed following the merge of the Serious Organised Crime Agency's cyber division with the Police Central E-Crime Unit (PCeU) of the Metropolitan Police Service, and is one of four current commands which look at the growing use of cybercrime and ways to identify it.

The current head of the NCCU is Dr Jamie Saunders, formally of the UK Foreign and Commonwealth Office (FCO), where from January 2012, he was director of international cyber policy.

== See also ==
- National Crime Agency
