= Hector Monsegur =

American computer hacker (born 1983)

Hector Xavier Monsegur
- Born: 1983 (age 42–43)
- Other name: Sabu
- Occupation: Cybersecurity
- Known for: Founder of LulzSec

Hector Xavier Monsegur (born 1983), known also by the online pseudonym Sabu (pronounced Sə'buː, Sæ'buː), is an American computer hacker and co-founder of the hacking group LulzSec. Monsegur became an informant for the FBI, working with the agency for over ten months to aid them in identifying the other hackers from LulzSec and related groups while facing a sentence of 124 years in prison. LulzSec intervened in the affairs of organizations such as News Corporation, Stratfor, UK and American law enforcement bodies and Irish political party Fine Gael.

Sabu featured prominently in the group's published IRC chats, and claimed to support the "Free Topiary" campaign. The Economist referred to Sabu as one of LulzSec's six core members.

== Early life, family and formal education ==
Hector Monsegur was born in New York to a 16-year-old father who raised him with his 40-year-old grandmother. Following the arrest of his father and his aunt for selling heroin, Monsegur moved to the Riis Houses (also known as the projects) in Alphabet City, Manhattan with his grandmother.

At a young age, Monsegur became interested in computers.

While attending Washington Irving High School, Monsegur was reprimanded by a security guard for bringing a screwdriver to school to help fix their computer system. Feeling insulted, he sent several complaints to the school administration. His complaints were deemed "threatening," and he was expelled. After this incident, he discontinued his formal education.

== Hacking career ==
An early experience with hacking was at age 14 when a Puerto Rican person was accidentally killed by the Marine Corps when they started bombing outside the test range on the island of Vieques, Puerto Rico. In response, Monsegur defaced various websites with messages protesting the US government's treatment of Puerto Ricans. On one site he included the line "Hello, I am Sabu, no one special for now."

In 2010, following the death of his grandmother, he became the foster parent to his two female cousins whom he was unable to support financially, so he began hacking. Committing mostly credit card fraud, he targeted large corporate bank accounts. Although he was at first only interested in hacking for profit, over time he became interested in hacktivism, and this renewed interest coincided with the rise of the political hacker group Anonymous, which he joined under the moniker "Sabu".

Sabu became the leader of a new hacking group formed by six Anonymous members. This new group was named Lulz Security (often abbreviated as LulzSec). LulzSec performed some hacks with political motives, but most of the hacks done by LulzSec were primarily motivated by a style of humor that they described as "the lulz". LulzSec was only active during a period that they referred to as the "50 days of lulz". In this time, their targets included News Corporation, Sony, and the CIA's official website.

Sabu was identified by rival hacker group Backtrace Security as "Hector Montsegur" [sic] on March 11, 2011, in "Namshub," a PDF publication (named after the Sumerian word for "incantation"). Backtrace Security was a group of ex-Anonymous members who had grown critical of vigilante hacktivism. One member of the group explained their motives by stating, "One cannot fight for justice and democracy by using unjust, anti-democratic tactics." Backtrace Security had found his identity through an IRC chatlog in which Sabu accidentally posted a link to his personal website.

== Arrest and guilty plea ==
Federal agents arrested Monsegur on June 7, 2011. The following day, Monsegur agreed to become an informant for the FBI and to continue his "Sabu" persona. A few days after that bail hearing, Monsegur entered a guilty plea to 12 criminal charges, including multiple counts of conspiracy to engage in computer hacking, computer hacking in furtherance of fraud, conspiracy to commit access device fraud, conspiracy to commit bank fraud and aggravated identity theft. He faced up to 124 years in prison.

== Activity as an informant for the FBI ==
As an informant, Monsegur provided the FBI with details enabling the arrest of five other hackers associated with the groups Anonymous, LulzSec and AntiSec. The FBI provided its own servers for the hacking to take place. Information Monsegur provided also resulted in the arrest of two UK hackers: James Jeffery and Ryan Cleary. The FBI attempted to use Monsegur to entrap Nadim Kobeissi, author of the secure communication software Cryptocat, but without success.

Monsegur maintained his pretense until March 6, 2012, even tweeting his "opposition" to the federal government until the very last minute. On March 6, 2012, the FBI announced the arrests of five male suspects: two from Britain, two from Ireland and one from the U.S. Anonymous reacted to Sabu's unmasking and betrayal of LulzSec on Twitter, "#Anonymous is a hydra, cut off one head and we grow two back".

A court filing made by prosecutors in late May 2014 revealed Monsegur had prevented 300 cyber-attacks in the three years since 2011, including planned attacks on NASA, the U.S. military and media companies.

Monsegur served 7 months in prison after his arrest but had been free since then while awaiting sentencing. At his sentencing on May 27, 2014, he was given "time served" for co-operating with the FBI and set free under one year of probation.

== Post-prison career ==
After his release from prison, Monsegur worked as a white hat hacker doing pentesting.
