= Mustafa Al-Bassam =

Iraqi-British computer hacker and co-founder of LulzSec

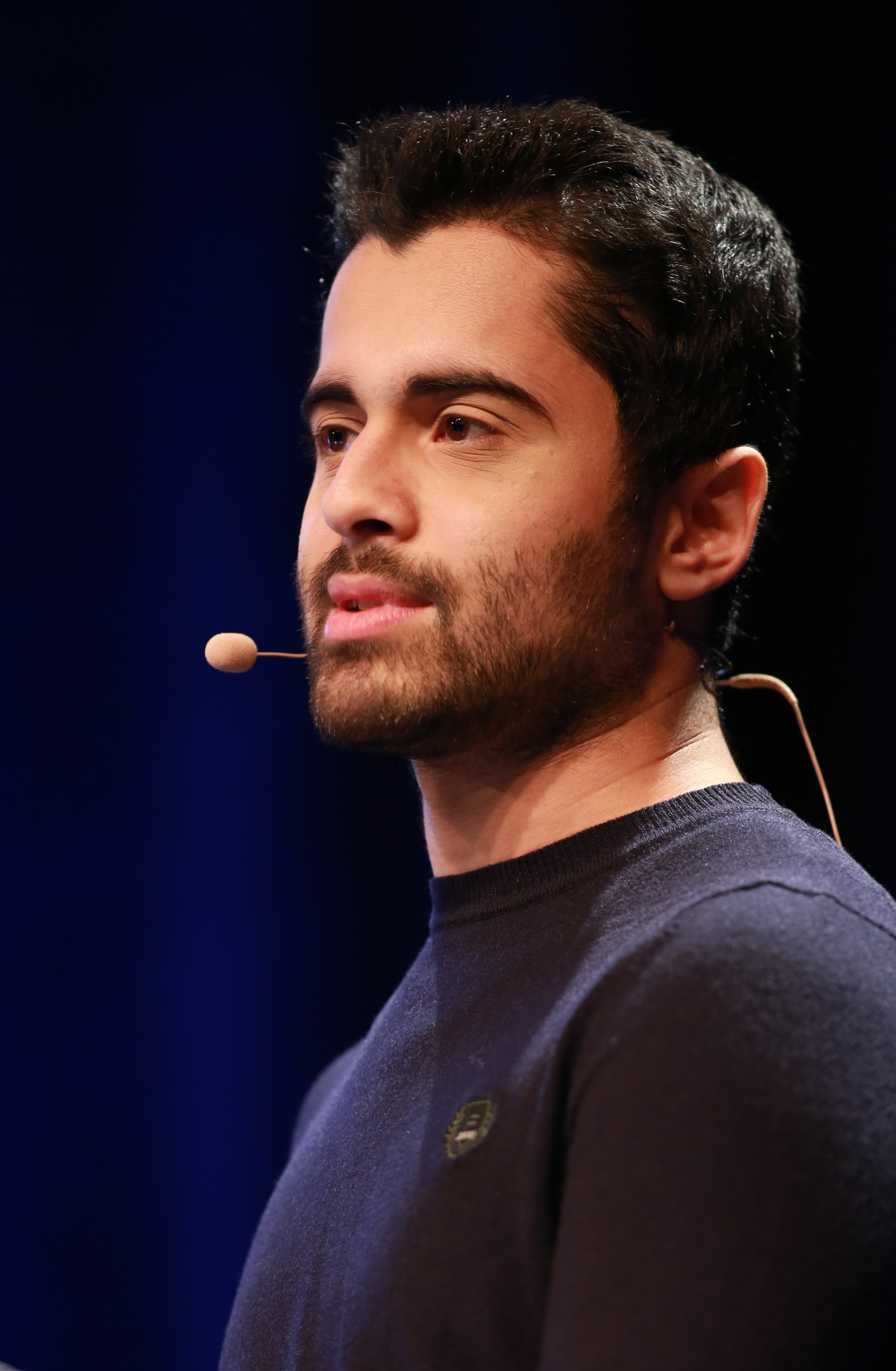
- Mustafa Al-Bassam giving a talk at the 34th Chaos Communication Congress (2017)
- Born: January 1995 (age 31); Baghdad, Iraq
- Other name: tflow
- Citizenship: British; Iraqi
- Education: King's College London; University College London
- Awards: Forbes 30 Under 30
- Scientific career
- Fields: Computer science
- Thesis: Securely scaling blockchain base layers (2020)
- Doctoral advisor: George Danezis

Mustafa Al-Bassam (born January 1995) is an Iraqi-British computer security researcher, hacker, and co-founder of Celestia Labs. Al-Bassam co-founded the hacker group LulzSec in 2011, which was responsible for several high profile breaches. He later went on to co-found Chainspace, a company implementing a smart contract platform, which was acquired by Facebook in 2019. In 2021, Al-Bassam graduated from University College London, completing a PhD in computer science with a thesis on Securely Scaling Blockchain Base Layers. In 2016, Forbes listed Al-Bassam as one of the 30 Under 30 entrepreneurs in technology.

== Early life and education ==
Al-Bassam was born in Baghdad, Iraq in January 1995, and migrated to London, United Kingdom when he was five years old. He received a BSc in computer science from King's College London, and subsequently completed a PhD at University College London.

== Hacktivism ==
In 2011 as a 16 year old teenager, Al-Bassam was one of the six core members of LulzSec during its 50-day hacking spree, going by the alias "tflow". The group used denial-of-service attacks and compromised a number of high profile organizations and corporations, including Sony, Fox, News International, Nintendo and the CIA.

He was also affiliated with the online association of hacktivists known as Anonymous, where he was involved with the hacking of emails from HBGary Federal, an intelligence contractor for the U.S. government. The emails revealed that HBGary Federal was working to develop astroturfing software to create an "army" of fake social media profiles, and was hired by the U.S. Chamber of Commerce to spy on and smear political opponents with fake documents and communications. As a result, members of the U.S. Congress called for an investigation into HBGary Federal.

=== Arrest and legal proceedings ===
On 20 July 2011, it was announced on Fox News and other press outlets that London's Metropolitan Police had arrested a 16-year-old student in London who was alleged to have used the nickname "Tflow" in a series of high-profile attacks on fox.com, the FBI affiliate "Infragard", PBS and Sony. For legal reasons, his name could not be disclosed for nearly two more years. On 9 April 2013, Tflow's full name was revealed along with his picture on multiple news outlets throughout the Internet. He pleaded guilty to computer misuse and received a 20-month suspended sentence with 320 hours of unpaid community service work. A nearly two-year internet ban imposed by police has since expired.

== Career and research ==
=== Distributed ledgers ===
Al-Bassam has published research on scaling blockchains and cryptocurrencies. He contributed to the design and implementation of Chainspace, a blockchain protocol that makes use of sharding to increase transaction throughput. Chainspace was later spun-out into a commercial company he co-founded, and was then acquired by Facebook in 2019 to become a part of the Libra project. Al-Bassam has since been critical of Libra, stating that "the road to dystopia is paved with good intentions, and I'm concerned about Libra's model for decentralization".

=== Privacy and surveillance ===
In 2014 Al-Bassam volunteered for Privacy International, where he released research on the computer destruction techniques that GCHQ used when forcing journalists at The Guardian's London headquarters to destroy the computers on which they stored copies of classified documents provided by NSA whistleblower Edward Snowden.

In an article for Motherboard, he revealed that GCHQ's Joint Threat Research Intelligence Group (JTRIG), had been involved with online sockpuppetry by creating a series of fake Twitter accounts and an URL shortener which was used as a honeypot for dissidents during the Arab spring, having been targeted by JTRIG himself.

== Awards and honours ==
In 2016, Al-Bassam was listed in the Forbes 30 Under 30 in the technology section for his work on uncovering government surveillance.
