= LulzRaft =

Computer hacker group

LulzRaft is the name of a computer hacker group or individual that gained international attention in 2011 due to a series of high-profile attacks on Canadian websites. Their targets have included the Conservative Party of Canada and Husky Energy.

On June 7, 2011, LulzRaft claimed responsibility for a hacking into the Conservative Party of Canada website and posting a false story about Canadian Prime Minister Stephen Harper. The hackers posted an alert on the site claiming that Harper had choked on a hash brown while eating breakfast and was airlifted to Toronto General Hospital. The story fooled many, including Canadian MP Christopher Alexander, who spread the story on Twitter. A spokesman for the Prime Minister soon denied the story.

LulzRaft again targeted the Conservative Party on June 8, taking responsibility for a successful breach of a database containing information about the party's donors. The information accessed by the group including the names of donors as well as their home and e-mail addresses. LulzRaft later stated that the party had "terrible security" and that for the intrusion it used very basic methods. LulzRaft also apparently hacked into the website of Husky Energy on the same day. They inserted a notice promising free gas to users who used the coupon code "hash-browns", claiming that it was a gesture of goodwill intended to placate conservatives who were offended by their previous attacks.

Though some commentators have speculated that the group is motivated by a dislike of the Conservative party, LulzRaft has stated that they are a non-partisan group with a general dislike of politicians. It is unknown whether the group is linked with LulzSec, although some media reports have included speculation that LulzRaft's attacks were inspired due to the copycat effect.
