= RSAC Conference =

Annual cryptography convention

- RSA Conference 2026
- Status: Active
- Genre: Professional conference
- Date: April 5-8, 2027
- Frequency: Several times a year
- Country: USA, United Kingdom, Asia & Japan, United Arab Emirates
- Years active: 35 years ago
- Inaugurated: 1991
- Founder: Jim Bidzos
- Previous event: Moscone Center, San Francisco, California, March 23-26, 2026
- Next event: Moscone Center, San Francisco, California, April 5-8, 2027
- Participants: IT Security Professionals
- Attendance: 45,000
- Website: onersac.com

The RSAC Conference, formerly known as the RSA Conference, is a series of IT security conferences. It was founded in 1991 as a small cryptography conference. RSAC conferences take place in the United States, Europe, Asia, and the United Arab Emirates each year. The conference also hosts educational, professional networking, and awards programs.

== History ==
=== Early history ===
The name RSA refers to the public-key encryption technology developed by RSA Data Security, Inc., which was founded in 1982. The abbreviation stands for Rivest, Shamir and Adleman, the inventors of the technique. The idea for the first RSA conference was conceived in 1991 in a phone call between then RSA Security CEO Jim Bidzos and the Executive Director of the Electronic Privacy Information Center. The first conference had just one panel, called "DES and DSS: Standards of Choice." It focused on why attendees should not adopt DSS, a standard that was expected to challenge RSA Security's status as the de facto standard for digital signatures.

The event steadily grew and in 1993 it attracted more than 200 attendees. Known for many years as the RSA Data Security Conference, it eventually became just the RSA Conference. Over time the conference grew more business-oriented with an older demographic and more vendors, which led to competitive issues for a time in the 1990s; European competitors to RSA Security sometimes could not get a booth, so they hired people to pass out flyers at the RSA conference encouraging attendees to visit them at hotels nearby. In 1995 the conference criticized the Clipper Chip. If implemented, the chip would have given the U.S. government direct access to evidence on telecommunications devices with the chip installed. The conference put up posters with "Sink Clipper" in big letters. By 1997 the conference had grown to 2,500 attendees. The first European RSA Conference took place in 2000 and started with just 5 tracks.

According to Network World the conference's focus expanded from cryptography into a broader IT security conference with larger attendance in 2005, when Microsoft CEO Bill Gates did the keynote presentation. According to Bidzos, the purpose of the conference became "for all kinds of things: drive standards, organize some opposition to government policies, promote the RSA name, [and] give all of our customers an opportunity". By 2008 the conference had 17,000 attendees and 375 participating IT security vendors. It had 18 tracks and 230 sessions.

=== 2010–present ===
At the 2010 RSA conference, the Obama administration publicly revealed the Comprehensive National Cybersecurity Initiative (CNCI), which was created in 2008 and formerly kept a secret. In 2011, a California-based IT security company, HBGary, withdrew from speaking and exhibiting at the RSA conference, citing safety concerns. The company announced plans to reveal the identities of some members of the hacktivist group Anonymous and received retaliatory threats and hacks. In 2014, 8 speakers boycotted the RSA conference after its sponsor, RSA Security, was accused of adding a backdoor to its products, so the National Security Agency could monitor users of RSA Security technology. The boycott began with then F-Secure Chief Technology Officer Mikko Hyppönen. He wanted RSA Security to apologize, whereas the company's statement was that the allegations were not true. Some noted that the RSA conference and RSA Security company are only loosely connected. Discussion at that year's conference was focused heavily on leaks by Edward Snowden and NSA involvement with American technology companies.

The first RSA Conference in the Asia-Pacific was introduced in 2013. This was followed by the inaugural United Arab Emirates conference two years later. In 2015 the conference added a clause to exhibitor contracts effectively prohibiting "booth babes" by requiring professional attire on the exhibitor floor. The policy was implemented in response to feedback that booth babes made the conference feel unprofessional. Fortune Magazine called the widespread practice of having booth babes at professional conferences "outdated" and unwelcoming to female attendees. The following year, the RSA conference was focused on the FBI–Apple encryption dispute, regarding attempts by the government to gain access to iPhones containing evidence in criminal investigations.

As of 2017, the conference has an estimated 40,000–43,000 attendees in the United States. The 2021 conference was held 100% virtually, due to concerns about COVID-19. The conference restored in-person events the following year.

In 2020, RSA Conference and its parent company, RSA Security, were acquired by several investors in a $2 billion deal. Two years later, RSA Security sold a majority interest in RSA Conference to private equity firm Crosspoint Capital Partners. RSA Security sold its remaining interest in the RSA Conference events business to other investors in 2022.

In early 2025, RSA Conference was rebranded to "RSAC Conference", the "C" standing for "community".

== Content ==
The RSA Conference is an international conference series on IT security that takes place in the United States, Europe, Asia/Japan, and the United Arab Emirates. It also provides internet safety education for consumers and children, a security scholar program for IT security students, and operates award programs typically bestowed at conferences. For example, one award is the Innovation Sandbox contest, which involves ten startups that present their technology to a panel of judges.

The 2017 conference in the U.S. had 15 keynotes, 700 speakers, 500 sessions, and 550 exhibitors. An analysis of session keywords at the conference suggest that early conferences were focused on cryptography and commerce, but the topical focus of conferences transitioned to cloud and cybersecurity in the early 2000s. Each conference has a theme, a practice that began in 1995. Additionally, there are typically one or two IT security topics that the conference organizers pick to focus on each year. Speaking positions at the RSA conference are highly competitive, with thousands of submissions for a few hundred speaking positions.

== RSA Conference Awards ==
As of 2024, the RSA conference sponsors the RSA Award for Excellence in Mathematics, co-sponsored by the International Association for Cryptologic Research, for "innovation and ongoing contributions to the field of cryptography and related underlying mathematics".
