= HBGary =

American cybersecurity company

- Industry: Computer software Computer security
- Founded: 2003
- Founder: Greg Hoglund
- Fate: Bought out
- Headquarters: Offices in Sacramento, California, Washington, D.C., and Bethesda, Maryland.
- Key people: Greg Hoglund (Founder & CEO); Penny Leavy (President); Aaron Barr (Former CEO of HBGary Federal)
- Website: HBGary Inc.

HBGary is a subsidiary company of ManTech International, focused on technology security. In the past, two distinct but affiliated firms had carried the HBGary name: HBGary Federal, which sold its products to the US Government, and HBGary, Inc. Its other clients included information assurance companies, computer emergency response teams, and computer forensic investigators. On 29 February 2012, HBGary, Inc. announced it had been acquired by IT services firm ManTech International. At the same time, HBGary Federal was reported to be closed.

== History ==
The company was founded by Greg Hoglund in 2003. In 2008, it joined the McAfee Security Innovation Alliance. The CEO made presentations at the Black Hat Briefings, the RSA Conference, and other computer security conferences. HBGary also analyzed the GhostNet and Operation Aurora events.

HBGary Federal had been set up with Aaron Barr as CEO instead of Hoglund to provide services and tools to the US government, which might require security clearance. As HBGary Federal could not meet revenue projections, in early 2011 negotiations about the sale of HBGary Federal were in progress with two interested companies.

HBGary was acquired by ManTech International in February 2012.

== WikiLeaks, Bank of America, Hunton & Williams, and Anonymous ==
Step 1 : Gather all the data
Step 2 : ???
Step 3 : Profit

— HBGary programmer to Barr disparaging his plan with a reference to an episode of South Park.

In 2010, Aaron Barr, CEO of HBGary Federal, alleged that he could exploit social media to gather information about hackers.

In early 2011, Barr claimed to have used his techniques to infiltrate Anonymous, partly by using IRC, Facebook, Twitter, and by social engineering. His e-mails depict his intention to release information on the identities of Anonymous members at the B-Sides conference and to sell it to possible clients, including the FBI. In the e-mails, Barr explained that he identified his list of suspected Anonymous "members" by tracing connections through social media, while his main programmer criticized this methodology. In a communiqué, Anonymous denied association with the individuals that Barr named.

On 5–6 February 2011, Anonymous compromised the HBGary website, copied tens of thousands of documents from both HBGary Federal and HBGary, Inc., posted tens of thousands of both companies' emails online, and usurped Barr's Twitter account in apparent revenge. Anonymous also claimed to have wiped Barr's iPad remotely. The Anonymous group responsible for these attacks became part of LulzSec.

=== Content of the emails ===
Some of the documents taken by Anonymous show HBGary Federal was working on behalf of Bank of America to respond to WikiLeaks' planned release of the bank's internal documents. "Potential proactive tactics against WikiLeaks include feeding the fuel between the feuding groups, disinformation, creating messages around actions to sabotage or discredit the opposing organization, and submitting fake documents to WikiLeaks and then calling out the error."

As a means of undermining Wikileaks, Aaron Barr suggested faking documents to damage Wikileaks' reputation and conducting "cyber attacks against the infrastructure to get data on document submitters. This would kill the project". He also suggested pressuring journalist Glenn Greenwald and other supporters of Wikileaks, who, Barr suggested, would choose to abandon support for Wikileaks in order to preserve their careers.

In the emails, two employees of HBGary referenced a blog post that endorsed manipulating translation software in order to 'mitigate' damaging content within information leaks.

Emails indicate Palantir Technologies, Berico Technologies, and the law firm Hunton & Williams, which was acting for Bank of America at the recommendation of the US Justice Department, all cooperated on the project. Other e-mails appear to show the U.S. Chamber of Commerce contracted the firms to spy on and discredit unions and liberal groups.

=== Fallout ===
The conflict with Anonymous caused substantial public relations damage. As a result, the involved organizations took steps to distance themselves from HBGary and HBGary Federal:

- 7 February 2011: Penny Leavy, President of HBGary Inc., entered an Anonymous IRC channel to negotiate with the group. She distanced her company from their partially owned subsidiary HBGary Federal, clarified the separation of the two, and asked Anonymous to refrain from attacks or leaks that would damage HBGary Inc. and its customers.
- 10 February 2011: The Chamber of Commerce issued a statement denying they hired HBGary, calling the allegation a "baseless smear," and criticizing the Center for American Progress and its blog, ThinkProgress, for "the illusion of a connection between HBGary, its CEO Aaron Barr and the Chamber." The Chamber denied the truth of accusations previously leveled by ThinkProgress, stating "No money, for any purpose, was paid to any of those three private security firms by the Chamber, or by anyone on behalf of the Chamber, including Hunton and Williams."
- 11 February 2011: Palantir's CEO apologized to Glenn Greenwald and severed "any and all contacts" with HBGary.
- The CEO and COO of Berico similarly stated that they had "discontinued all ties" with HBGary Federal.
- 28 February 2011: Aaron Barr announced his resignation from HBGary Federal to "focus on taking care of my family and rebuilding my reputation."
- 1 March 2011: 17 members of the United States Congress called for a congressional investigation for possible violation of federal law by Hunton & Williams and "Team Themis" (the partnership between Palantir Technologies, Berico Technologies, and HBGary Federal).
- 16 March 2011: The House Armed Services Subcommittee on Emerging Threats and Capabilities asked the Defense Department and the National Security Agency to provide any contracts with HBGary Federal, Palantir Technologies and Berico Technologies for investigation.

=== Astroturfing ===
It has been reported that HBGary Federal was contracted by the US government to develop astroturfing software which could create an "army" of multiple fake social media profiles.

=== Malware development ===
HBGary had made numerous threats of cyber-attacks against WikiLeaks. The hacked emails revealed HBGary Inc. was working on the development of a new type of Windows rootkit, code-named Magenta, that would be "undetectable" and "almost impossible to remove."

In October 2010, Greg Hoglund proposed to Barr creating "a large set of unlicensed Windows 7 themes for video games and movies appropriate for the Middle East & Asia" [sic] which "would contain back doors" as part of an ongoing campaign to attack support for WikiLeaks.

== Acquisition by ManTech International ==
On 29 February 2012, ManTech International announced its purchase of HBGary, Inc. Financial terms of the acquisition were not disclosed other than to say it was an "asset purchase", which excludes legal and financial liabilities.
