= Police Central e-Crime Unit =

Part of the Specialist Crime Directorate of the Metropolitan Police Service in London

The Police Central e-Crime Unit (PCeU) was part of the Specialist Crime Directorate of the Metropolitan Police Service in London, dedicated to combating e-crime in England, Wales and Northern Ireland. The unit had a national remit, and was created in April 2008 to centralise the efforts of all police forces in the UK (excluding Scotland) to fight all forms of E-crime.

The unit's responsibilities were quite specific and included activities once carried out by other bodies while excluding other activities, currently done by others.

The unit's stated mission was to improve the police response to victims of e-crime by developing the capability of the police service across England, Wales and Northern Ireland, co-ordinating the law enforcement approach to all types of e-crime, and by providing a national investigative capability for the most serious e-crime incidents.

The PCeU was created on 1 October 2008 and was responsible for improving the UK national policing response to cyber crime. The unit was housed within the Specialist Crime Directorate (SCD6) part of the Metropolitan Police Service based in central London. It had jurisdiction within England, Wales and Northern Ireland. However the unit worked closely with the SCDEA in Scotland and international law enforcement. The PCeU had a seat at the table at both the Europol and Interpol cyber workstreams.

Since February 2012 the PCeU had a presence outside London with the creation of 3 regional hubs. The hubs are located in England in the North West, North East and Midlands areas. The hubs were launched at the ACPO cyber conference in Sheffield.

The PCeU was one of the strands of work within the ACPO e-crime programme led by DAC Janet Williams.

As of 2013, the PCeU is being merged into the National Cyber Crime Unit, part of the new National Crime Agency.
