= Syrian Collegiate Programming Contest =

ACM Syrian Collegiate Programming Contest (abbreviated as ACM-SCPC or SCPC) is an annual multi-tiered competitive programming competition among the universities of Syria and it's a qualifying round to the ACM Arabian Collegiate Programming Contest (ACPC). Winners of the SCPC qualify to the ACPC Finals. It is usually held in July of each year. Headquartered at SCS Syrian Computer Society. The SCPC operates in autonomous cities in Syria under the auspices of the ICPC Foundation in accordance with the ACPC Policies and Procedures.

== History ==
The SCPC traces its roots to a competition held at SCS Syrian Computer Society in 2011. Then, it was also hosted at SCS Syrian Computer Society in 2012 and 2013. In 2014, it was co-hosted by Damascus and Tishreen University. In 2015, it was hosted at Tishreen University. In 2016, it was hosted by the Higher Institute of Applied Sciences and Technology. In 2017, it was hosted by the Syrian Virtual University.

== Latest SCPC Standings ==
- SCPC 2017 First 10 places

| Place | Institution | Team | Problems solved | Total time | Last solution |
|---|---|---|---|---|---|
| 1 | AmrMahmoud Academy | GeniusJaddouh ft Deadwing | 7 | 786 | 213 |
| 2 | Dragon Ball Z (Spacetoon) | Saiyan Squad | 7 | 979 | 268 |
| 3 | Brazzers (SY) | 69 | 6 | 695 | 251 |
| 4 | Cambridge (England) | Tornado | 6 | 880 | 268 |
| 5 | Coach Shahhoud (SY) | Coach Shahhoud | 6 | 1021 | 292 |
| 6 | HIT (Hag Institute of Technology) (USA) | Hag ft coach khaled | 5 | 402 | 150 |
| 7 | حماصنه (SY) | Coach Tony ft Daniar | 5 | 567 | 243 |
| 8 | السفاره في العماره (EG) | Shalabi | 5 | 581 | 201 |
| 9 | Jaddouh Academy(SY) | The Cereal killer | 5 | 657 | 298 |
| 10 | so bored | have a nice day | 5 | 680 | 274 |

== See also ==
- ACM Student Research Competition
- Competitive programming, a type of mind sport involved in programming competitions
- International Collegiate Programming Contest
- Online judge, a service to practice for programming contests and run them online
- PC², the Programming Contest Control System in support of Computer Programming Contest activities (used at ICPC World Finals until 2008)
