= Parmy Olson =

Journalist

- Occupations: Journalist, author
- Years active: 2000s–present
- Employer(s): The Wall Street Journal (current), formerly Forbes
- Known for: Forbes bureau chief, reporting on Anonymous
- Notable work: Supremacy: AI, ChatGPT and the race that will change the world
- Awards: Financial Times Business Book of the Year (2024)

Parmy Olson is a tech journalist for The Wall Street Journal. While at Forbes, she was known for her work on the hacktivist movement Anonymous. She describes herself as covering "agitators and innovators in mobile".

Early in her career with Forbes, she wrote a series of articles about the subprime mortgage crisis. She served as Forbes' London bureau chief from 2008–12 before moving to the magazine's San Francisco office.

Olson won the 2024 Financial Times Business Book of the Year Award for Supremacy: AI, ChatGPT and the race that will change the world.

== We Are Anonymous ==
In 2012, Little, Brown and Company published her book We Are Anonymous: Inside the Hacker World of LulzSec, Anonymous, and the Global Cyber Insurgency. Prior to writing it, Olson had spent a year researching Anonymous. The book details the early rise of Anonymous on the 4chan imageboard and chronicles the cyberattacks of Project Chanology (an anti-Church of Scientology protest) and Operation Payback (retaliation for actions against The Pirate Bay and WikiLeaks, respectively). In the book's later chapters, Olson follows the exploits and eventual arrests of Anonymous spinoff group LulzSec, formed by hacktivists Sabu, Topiary, and others.

Janet Maslin of The New York Times called We Are Anonymous a "lively, startling book". Rowan Kaiser of The A.V. Club said the book was "an eminently human tale" that moves "from an interesting retelling of recent events into a bigger metaphorical story about order and chaos in activist communities"; Kaiser gave it a grade of "A". Olson appeared on The Daily Show with Jon Stewart to discuss the book on June 18, 2012. The Daily called it "a brilliant book": "a masterpiece of shoe-leather journalism, a fast-paced, richly detailed account of the group’s beginnings, various schisms and most spectacular attacks".

Kirkus Reviews praised Olson's depictions of some events, but stated that the descriptions of Anonymous infighting were "lengthy" and "tiresome". The review concluded that We Are Anonymous was "certain to thrill 4chan readers, hackers and others on the Internet’s fringe, but may struggle to hold the interest of casual readers." Quinn Norton of Wired wrote a negative review of the book, criticizing Olson's grasp of technical detail, her focus on criminal elements of Anonymous, and her perceived failure to acknowledge the difficulties of writing about a group known for secrecy, dishonesty, and self-aggrandizement. She concludes her review, "the only voices in Olson's book are those of the small groups of hackers who stole the limelight from a legion, defied their values, and crashed violently into the law. It was a mediagenic story to be sure, but in the end, it turns out to be not the real story of Anonymous, and not a story with any real meaning."

== Supremacy AI, ChatGPT and the Race That Will Change the World ==
In her book supremacy, Parmy Olson examines the development of artificial intelligence and the competition between OpenAI and DeepMind, focusing on the roles of Sam Altman, CEO of OpenAI, and Demis Hassabis, CEO of DeepMind, in the development of advanced AI technologies. While critically examining their ambitions to build increasingly powerful and potentially superintelligent systems, she highlights the risks of allowing commercial interests and the growing power of major technology companies to influence the development and deployment of such technologies. Drawing on her experience covering the technology industry and interviews with sources within the field, Olson documents the rivalry between the two companies and the growing adoption of AI systems across different sectors. The book examines the risk associated with the rapid expansion of these technologies, including algorithmic bias, system errors, and the influence of commercial interests on the development and deployment of AI. Olson further considers the relationship between major technology companies and the increasing economic power generated by artificial intelligence, as well as the potential effects of AI on industries such as education, media, and manufacturing. The book places the development of advanced AI within the broader context of technological competition and its possible social and economic consequences.
