= Christopher Doyon =

American hacktivist

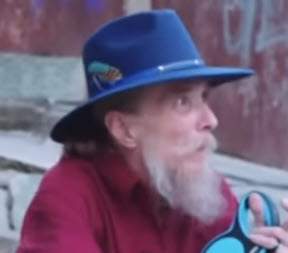

Personal details
- Born: Christopher Doyon; 1964 (age 61–62) Maine, United States
- Occupation: Hacktivist
- Nickname: Commander X

Christopher Doyon (born 1964), also known as Commander X, is an American hacktivist and has been associated with Anonymous.

== First arrest ==
Doyon was arrested in September 2011 for using the High Orbit Ion Cannon to make a DDoS attack on servers belonging to Santa Cruz County, California. The attack, which occurred in December 2010, was triggered by a new law affecting the homeless community of which Doyon was a part, and it affected Santa Cruz servers for just 30 minutes. The government alleged a few thousand dollars in damages for investigation and remediation, clearing threshold of the Computer Fraud and Abuse Act and making the DDoS a federal crime.

Helped by his pro bono attorney Jay Leiderman, Doyon jumped bail in February 2012 and fled across the border into Canada. He spent around seven years issuing press releases, maintaining a presence on Twitter, and writing a self-published memoir, talking to journalists and appearing in documentaries.

== Second arrest ==
On June 11, 2021, several armed, uniformed, Mexican men identifying themselves as DEA agents attempted to gain entry to the community where Doyon lived in Mexico City, Mexico but were turned away. They returned dressed as civilians, with representatives from the US Embassy, scaled the walls of the compound and took Doyon away in the early evening. This was confirmed by a press release from the US Attorney for the Northern District of California, where Doyon was imprisoned, though no details were provided.

In 2022, Doyon pled guilty to his 2011 charges.
