= Christopher Weatherhead =

British cyber criminal

- Other names: Nerdo
- Known for: Privacy International, Operation Payback

Christopher Weatherhead, also known by his alias Nerdo, is an activist, hacker and technologist. Weatherhead was jailed for his involvement in several cyberattacks by hacker collective Anonymous.

== Anonymous ==
Weatherhead has been an active leader for Anonymous, a loose-knit group of "hacktivists". It was reported that Weatherhead had seniority within the group.

== Operation Payback ==
Weatherhead played a significant role in Operation Payback, a series of cyberattacks conducted by Anonymous against various organizations because the hackers "did not agree with their views." In particular, Weatherhead was known for his work on Operation Avenge Assange, which was part of Operation Payback as a whole. Operation Avenge Assange focused on disrupting PayPal and other payment sites that despite transferring funds indiscriminately for other organisations, including neonazi organisations, would not process transfers to the Wau Holland Foundation, which raises funds for WikiLeaks, after attention shifted from companies involved in digital rights. Weatherhead reportedly was instrumental in bringing down PayPal for 10 days, resulting in a reported £3.5million in losses for the company.

In January 2013, Weatherhead was sentenced to 18 months in prison for his part in the denial-of-service attacks on PayPal, Visa and MasterCard in December 2010.

== Privacy International ==
After Weatherhead completed his sentence he went on to work for Human Rights charity Privacy International. Weatherhead is notable for his advocacy relating to targeted advertising and data protection.

== Weatherhead v. The United Kingdom ==
Following on from Human Rights Watch (and Others) v The United Kingdom at the European Court of Human Rights, Weatherhead who was a party to that case was awarded compensation and an apology from the British Government for being unlawfully spyed on, in violation of his Article 8 rights.
