= Gigya =

Gigya, Inc.
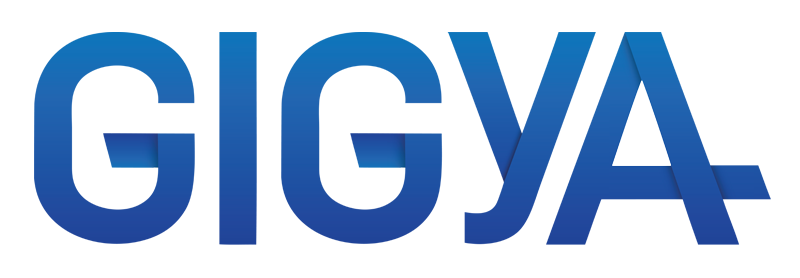
- Type: Subsidiary
- Industry: Customer identity management
- Founded: 2006
- Defunct: 2017
- Fate: Acquired by SAP
- Headquarters: Mountain View, California, United States
- Area served: Worldwide
- Key people: Patrick Salyer; (CEO); Rooly Eliezerov; (Co-Founder & President); Eyal Magen; (Co-Founder and Chief Strategy Officer); Eran Kutner; (Co-Founder & Chief Technology Officer)
- Number of employees: 280 (as of 2017)
- Parent: SAP
- Website: www.gigya.com

Gigya, Inc. was a technology company founded in Tel Aviv, Israel and headquartered in Mountain View, California, with additional offices in New York, Tel Aviv, London, Paris, Hamburg, and Sydney.

Gigya was purchased by SAP in 2017.

== Products ==
Gigya offered a customer identity management platform for managing profiles, preference, opt-in and consent settings, and an identity management platform for businesses that included products for customized registration, social login, user profile and preference management, user engagement and loyalty, and integrations with third-party marketing and services platforms.

== History ==
Gigya was founded in Tel Aviv, Israel in 2006.

In 2008-2009, the company's main business was widget distribution profitable through advertising.

Patrick Salyer became CEO in March 2011. Gigya has worked with SAP Hybris since 2013.

As of November 2014, Gigya had raised $104M from Intel Capital, Benchmark Capital, Mayfield Fund, First Round Capital, Advance Publications (parent company of Condé Nast), DAG Ventures, Common Fund Capital, Vintage Investment Partners, and Greenspring Associates. Software maker Adobe Systems is also an investor. In the same year, the Syrian Electronic Army hijacked the gigya.com domain by changing its DNS configuration at the domain registrar directly, outside of Gigya's system and control. Shortly after the incident, Patrick Salyer, CEO of Gigya, confirmed the news on the company blog, stating that no data was compromised, and the issue had been resolved within an hour of Gigya identifying the issue. The Syrian Electronic Army issued a statement taking responsibility for the attack.

In September 2017, the company was acquired by SAP for $350 million.

== See also ==
- Economy of Israel
- Science and technology in Israel
