= Anonplus =

Social networking platform

Anonplus was a social networking service developed by Anonymous.

== History ==
It was announced in July 2011, after Anonymous was banned from Google+ and all other Google sites. The site was intended to be an open source and anonymous networking platform. Edward Moyer of CNET noted that at the time of its launch the site featured "often-awkward writing" and "amateurish typography and site design."

According to an anonymous interview in Digital Trends, the project was not an official project of Anonymous as the developers' had distanced themselves from the group, despite close ties.

On 21 July 2011, Anonplus was hacked by a rival group of hackers, apparently based in Turkey. AnonPlus's main webpage was replaced with an image of a dog wearing a suit, mocking the more normal Anonymous logo, and messages in Turkish and English. Three days later, it was defaced a second time by the rival hacking group Syrian Electronic Army. On August 8, 2011, another cyberattack was carried out against the site in retaliation for Anonymous' attack on the Syrian Ministry of Defense. Citizen Lab connected the attack to the Syrian Electronic Army, who had a history of attacking organizations critical of the Syrian government.

The social networking site has since been abandoned. The website was updated 13 November 2011 with a press release which mentioned that the project had entered an invite-only beta phase. According to this document, the project entered this beta phase on 5 November 2011. The document also explained that it had become a goal of the project to target censorship. Since that point, the domain has expired and no mention has been made of the project on any social media outlets.
