= Tekel workers' protests =

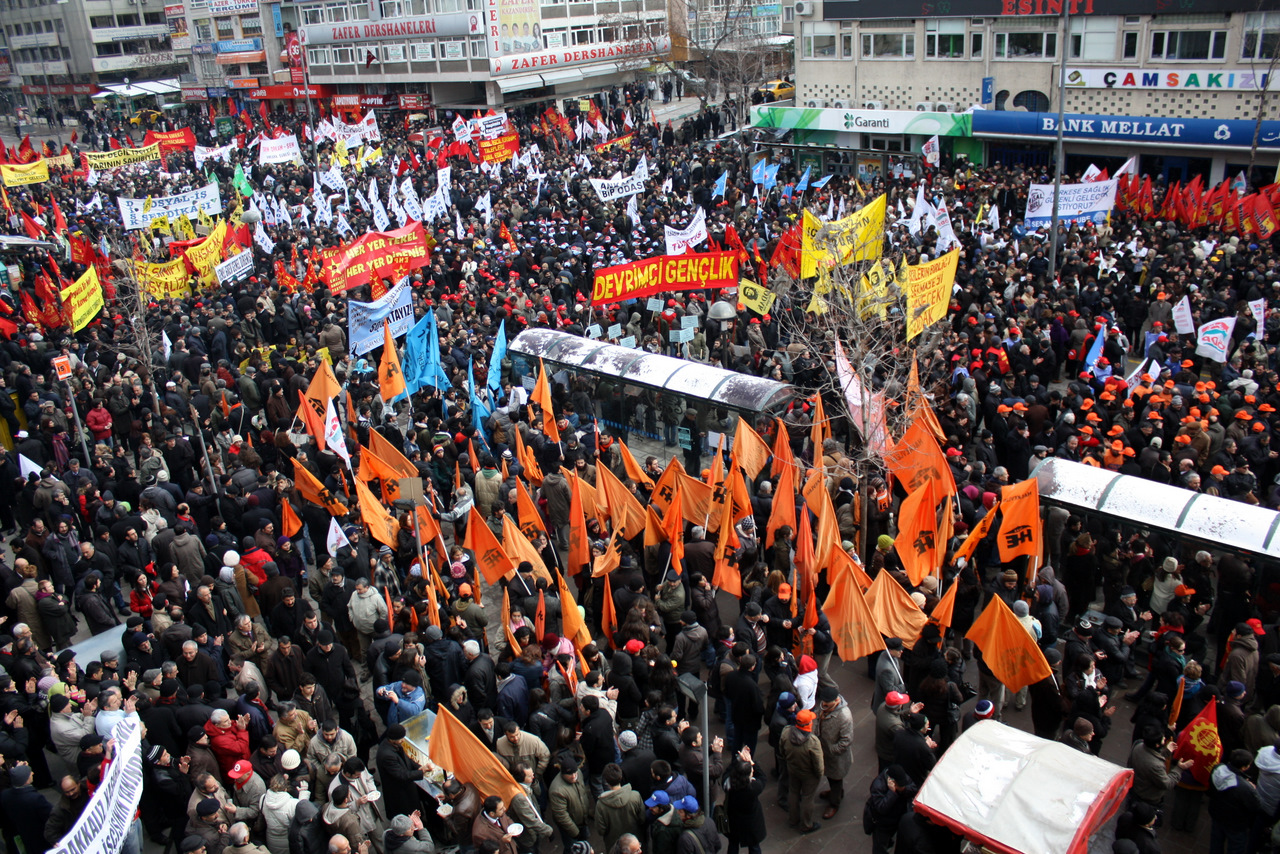
- Support strike for the Tekel protests, Ankara, February 4 2010
- Date: December 15, 2009 – May 26, 2010
- Location: Ankara, Turkey; 39°55′20.9″N 32°51′26.7″E

Tekel workers' protests are the strikes and mass protests started by Tekel workers organized by Tekgıda-İş, an affiliate of the Confederation of Turkish Trade Unions, in Ankara on December 15, 2009. The protests included the biggest strike in Turkey since the 1980 coup d'état, which began on February 4 2010. Besides being covered by mainstream media for days, protests were supported by a large mass and garnered international support as well.

== Background ==
The Justice and Development Party's government that came to power in 2002 passed policies that followed the trend of privatization in Turkey as they sold many government institutions to the private sector with various selling methods. As part of said policies, the Directorate of Privatization Administration auctioned off the cigarette and tobacco department of Tekel in 2008. As result, British American Tobacco company (BAT) bought the tobacco factories of Tekel in Adana, Ballıca, Bitlis, Malatya, Samsun, and Tokat for 1,720,000,000 USD. Shortly after the auction, BAT announced it would lay off most of the workers at the new factories, citing the contract's no job guarantee. The privatized company laid off 8,247 of Tekel's 10,818 workers. They shut down all of the factories except for the one in Ballıca.

== Inciting of the protests ==
Individuals who are employed under contract for duties that are determined by the Council of Ministers, based on the opinions of the State Personnel Department and the Ministry of Finance, to be of less than one year or seasonal, within the specified wage and number limits, and who are not considered workers.

— Article 4, paragraph C of the Civil Servants Law No. 657

With some previous privatizations, workers of the privatized institutions were transferred to other government institutions. However, the government did not go with this route for TEKEL, and suggested to transfer the workers to 4/C, a temporary contract status for government workers. The workers opposed this transfer on the following basis: Workers would be included in this scope after receiving their severance package. A 4/C worker can work for a maximum of 10 months in a year, and a minimum of 4. A worker earning approximately 1200 TL would earn around 630 TL as a 4/C worker. Furthermore, a 4/C worker has neither overtime pay nor paid leave rights, and all acquired personal rights are taken away.

== International support for the protests ==
The Food, Beverages and Catering Union, the sister union of the Tekgıda-İş in Germany, took on the coordination of international solidarity with Tekel workers.

As a result of the coordination of the European Parliament, the International Trade Union Confederation, European Trade Union Confederation, IUF, and NGG, the Tekel workers gained the support of the entire global labor movement. The issue was brought to the attention of the European Parliament. MEP Jürgen Klute and Selahattin Yıldırım from the NGG went to the Ministry of Labour to request a social solution. Panagiotis Lafazanis, then General Secretary of the Greek Synaspismos, announced their support for the actions of the Tekel workers.

== Chronology ==
- December 15, 2009, the first day of the protests. Workers began their march to Ankara, and were stopped at Gölbaşı by the police. After further endeavors, they entered the city and marched to the JDP headquarters. Because of the rain and harsh winter of Ankara, some of the workers were taken to the Atatürk Sports Arena and some were taken to the Turkish Metal Workers Union.
- December 17, 2009, the workers came together at Abdi İpekçi Park. Eighteen workers attempted to occupy the Atatürk Boulevard and were detained.
- December 18, 2009, police intervened with tear gas against the workers at Abdi İpekçi Park. The workers met back at the TÜRK-İŞ headquarters, and started a tent city to stay warm at night.
- On December 22, 2009, the Ankara Chamber of Doctors set up a temporary infirmary in the TÜRK-İŞ headquartes.
- On December 23, 2009, TÜRK-İŞ Board of Presidents met, and set out a continuous action plan.
- On December 25, 2009, the unions and confederations held a warning action to go to work 1 hour late to support the TEKEL workers. People from various cities marched to their local Justice and Development Party buildings in protest.
- On December 26, 2009, TÜRK-İŞ Board of Presidents walked from Güvenpark to the parliament to discuss the situation with political parties in house. The first rally was held by the Communist Party of Turkey in solidarity with the TEKEL workers.
- On December 30, 2009, TÜRK-İŞ Board of Presidents decided to organize a rally for the new year. Various musicians and artists joined.
- On January 6, 2010, a referendum about the future of the protests was held among TEKEL workers. Around 10,000 workers voted in total, and the final decision was to continue the protests.
- On January 7, 2010, Tekgıda-İş declared that around 12,000 workers would be in Ankara to protest with their partners. They announced that until the problem resolved they would sit-in for the first 3 days, start a hunger strike in the next 3 days, and start an indefinite fast (which includes not drinking water) if it was still unresolved.
- On January 8, 2010, 42 TEKEL workers who were planning to chain themselves in front of the Justice and Development Party headquartes were detained.
- On January 15, 2010, 10,000 workers began their sit-in action.
- On January 16, 2010, the Intellectuals for TEKEL Platform was established. 367 academics signed a declaration, stating that the workers of TEKEL were displaying a heroic act of struggle; and that actions of TÜRK-İŞ were insufficient and a general strike should be organized.
- On January 17, 2010, a Türk-İş rally was held in Sıhhiye Square. Around 10,000 people attended. While workers asked for a general strike, the union president stayed silent. Around 150 of the workers entered the Türk-İş building and threw slogans, asking for the union president Mustafa Kumlu to resign. Kumlu kept on with his speech.
- On January 26, 2010, a rally in support of the protest was held in Sakarya Avenue
- On February 4, 2010, a nationwide general strike was held in support of TEKEL workers. The following statement was made by Mustafa Kumlu regarding the strike: “Despite the pressure and threats from governors, bureaucrats and bosses; the exercise of our 'right to not work', agreed on with the decision of the worker and civil servant confederations, was successfully carried out nationwide.”
- On February 12, 2010, Türk-İş union applied to the Council of State to abolish the 4/C application. Tekgıda-İş's lawyer also stated that the "temporary worker" conditions on article 4/C were against the Labour Law. Tekgıda-İş too applied to the Council of State for the abolition of the 1-month period granted to switch to 4/C, claiming that one month was not enough to deliberate such an action. Cancellation of the deadline would allow TEKEL workers to not switch until the deadline on March 4th.
- On February 14, 2010, a solidarity rally was organized by the Communist Party of Turkey, Halkevleri, and the Freedom and Solidarity Party.
- On February 20, 2010, a march was held in solidarity with TEKEL workers, initiated by TÜRK-İŞ, DİSK, KESK, and Türkiye Kamu-Sen, with participation of civil society organizations and political parties. Then-Governor of Ankara Kemal Önal declared the march illegal, but did not order the police to intervene with the march.
- On February 25, 2010, Hamdullah Uysal, one of the protesting TEKEL workers, died after being hit by a drunk driver while walking to fajr. The workers saw Uysal as a martyr and wanted his funeral to be brought to the tent city in front of the Türk-İş headquarters. The police didn't allow them to do so.
- On March 1, 2010, the 12th Chamber of the Council of State suspended the execution of the provision of the Council of Ministers Decision dated February 4, 2010, which stipulated that temporary workers, including TEKEL workers, must apply to the relevant institutions until March 4th for transition to 4/c status.
- On March 2, 2010, 10:00 AM, Tekgıda-İş President Mustafa Türkel announced, "Today at 1:00 PM we are taking down the tents and ending our action. We will take a 15-20 day break from the action." As per the decision taken by Tekgıda-İş, the workers began taking down the tents at 1:00 PM. TEKEL workers made a statement emphasizing that they would resume their protests on April 1, 2010.
- On April 1, 2010, TEKEL workers from all over Türkiye mobilized to Ankara to continue their protest against the 4/C system. Early in the morning, police intercepted buses carrying Tekel workers from surrounding provinces at main entry routes into Ankara, turning them away under the Ankara Governorship's decision declaring the demonstration illegal. Workers who managed to reach the city assembled along Mithatpaşa Avenue to march toward the TÜRK-İŞ headquarters on Tuna Street, but the police barricaded off the roads and blocked their access. On Ziya Gökalp Avenue, KESK members supporting the workers attempted to close the road toward Kolej after waiting for three hours. When the group pushed against police barricades despite warnings, police shot tear gas cannisters at the group. Following the dispersal, demonstrators retreated into Dr. Mediha Eldem Street, threw stones at the police, returned to the barricades to chant protest slogans, and subsequently launched a sit-in on Adakale Street. A police helicopter carrying Ankara Governor Kemal Önal and Police Chief Orhan Özdemir surveyed the area and directed ground forces throughout the incidents. Groups gathered on Tuna Avenue to await the outcome of negotiations between TÜRK-İŞ President Mustafa Kumlu and Minister of Interior Beşir Atalay, while union leaders and opposition officials publicly criticized the heavy security lockdown around Kızılay. In response to the police preventing the workers from entering the area in front of the TÜRK-İŞ building on Sakarya Street, the TEKEL workers decided to spend the night in Ankara and to hold a press conference in front of TÜRK-İŞ at 11:00 AM on April 2, 2010. The union announced that if the police's attitude remained the same as on April 1st, preventing them from entering the streets, the TEKEL workers would remain in Ankara. If the protesters were allowed to enter the streets, the workers announced that they would end their protest there.
- However, the police did not allow the TEKEL workers and union leaders to enter their union building. The workers, who were allowed to enter a part of the street, made a press statement there. However, the police intervened again and removed the TEKEL workers from the street. They ended their actions and returned home to prepare for the general strike on May 26.
