= Syrian Computer Society =

The Syrian Computer Society (Arabic: الجمعية العلمية السورية للمعلوماتية, romanized: al-Jam‘iyya al-‘Ilmiyya as-Sūriyya lil-Ma‘lūmātiyya) is an organization in Syria. It was founded by Bassel al-Assad in 1989, and was subsequently headed by his brother Bashar al-Assad, who would later become the President of Syria. It acted as Syria's domain name registration authority and was reported to have been closely associated with the Syrian state.

In May 2013, 700 domains registered by Syrians, mostly hosted at servers with IP addresses assigned to the Syrian Computer Society, were reported to have been seized by the U.S. DNS infrastructure operator Network Solutions. The domain names became registered to "OFAC Holding", believed to be a reference to the U.S. federal government's Office of Foreign Assets Control.

Some members of the Syrian Computer Society belonged to the first group of supporters of the Syrian Electronic Army.
