= Quinn Norton =

American journalist (born 1973)

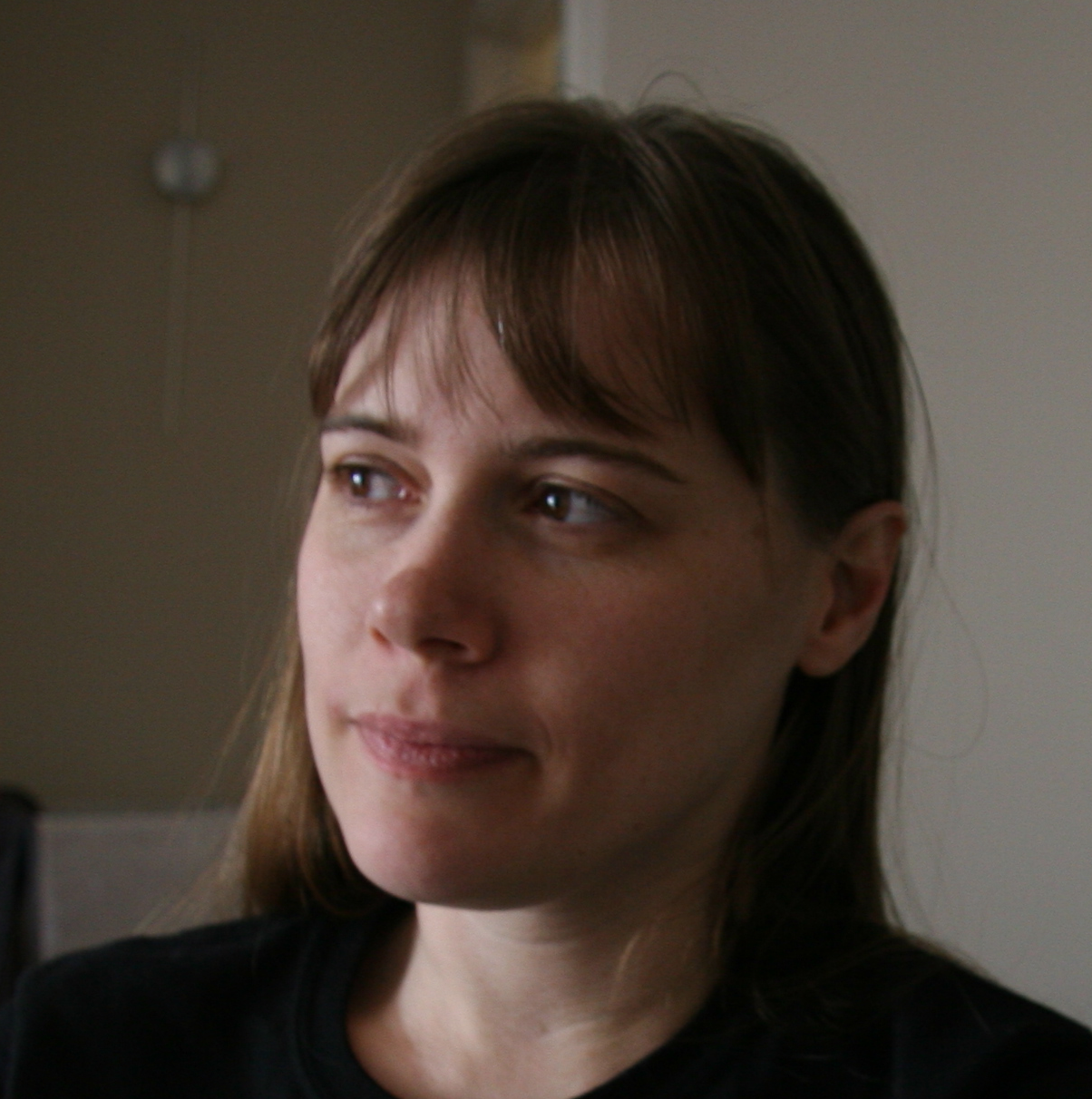
- Norton in 2007
- Born: May 1973 (age 53)
- Occupations: Journalist; Essayist
- Children: 1
- Website: QuinnNorton.com

Quinn Norton (born May 1973) is an American journalist and essayist. Her work covers hacker culture, Anonymous, the Occupy movement, intellectual property and copyright issues, and the Internet.

== Early life and education ==
Quinn Norton was born in May 1973. She grew up in a poor family. She was raised between Los Angeles and Phoenix. Her father's struggles with his experience post-Vietnam and his drug-related incarceration inspired her to write later about judicial reform and restorative justice.

Norton completed a GED and attended Orange Coast Community College. She sporadically sat in on classes at University of California, Los Angeles and University of California, Santa Barbara but was never formally enrolled.

== Career ==
Norton began her professional life as a technologist when she worked as a systems administrator and web programmer. In 2006, she shifted to journalism. Her focus was initially on technology but eventually grew to encompass internet activism.

In 2006, Norton described a conceptual prank called Quinn's Prank / Quinn's Symphonic Conundrum involving writing and executing a computer program that would output all possible melodies, theoretically providing the opportunity to claim copyright for all music.

Norton's work has appeared in Wired, where she spent a year embedded with Occupy Wall Street. She contributed regularly to the Wired blog, Threat Level, which focused on digital security. From 2013 to 2014, she wrote a column, Notes on a Strange World, at Medium. She wrote articles for Maximum PC magazine for five years and has published in The Guardian, ProPublica, Gizmodo, and O'Reilly Media publications such as Make magazine. She was a long-time participant at O'Reilly's Foo Camp.

Norton has spoken extensively on various aspects of technology, history and culture. From 2006 to 2008, she gave talks at technology conferences about body enhancement, usually under the title "Body Hacking." In connection with this work, Norton taught a course at NYU titled "Laboratory of the Self." As part of her research, Norton had a magnet implanted in the tip of her ring finger, enabling her to sense magnetic fields. The magnet was later removed.

In 2018, The New York Times announced Norton as its new lead opinion writer covering technology. The hire drew sharp criticism focused on tweets Norton wrote between 2013 and 2017, particularly use of slurs referring to gay people and her defense of her friendship with Andrew Auernheimer, a hacker and white supremacist known as weev. Later that day, she and the Times announced she would not join the paper after all; the Times said it had been unaware of her comments. Calling the episode an example of "context collapse", and describing herself as a member of the LGBT community, Norton said her use of slurs had been specific to the context of engaging with the language of hackers. She also said her friendship with Auernheimer (with whom she was no longer in contact) had been an effort to discourage his racism. The incident led to debate over the ethics of free speech in the hacking community at large as well as Times social media policy.

== Advocacy ==
Norton is an advocate of encryption when communicating electronically.

In 2009, she opposed the Cyber Intelligence Sharing and Protection Act (CISPA).

Norton describes herself as an anarchist and a queer activist.

=== Aaron Swartz ===
On March 3, 2011, Norton was subpoenaed to testify before a grand jury regarding an investigation of her then-partner Aaron Swartz that led to the case United States v. Swartz. She ultimately accepted a proffer agreement with the prosecutor, whereby she shared information about the Guerrilla Open Access Manifesto, which Swartz either wrote or co-wrote. The document offered the prosecution additional evidence in their case against Swartz.

Articles in The Atlantic and in New York Magazine indicate that in 2011 Norton was pressured by prosecutors to offer information or testimony that could be used against Swartz in his trial for fraud for downloading thousands of academic articles from behind a paywall, but that she denied having information that supported prosecutors' claims of criminal intentions on Swartz's part. Prosecutors nevertheless attempted to use a public blog post on Swartz's blog that Norton mentioned, which may or may not have been co-authored by Swartz, as proof of a criminal intent.

=== Robert Scoble ===
In October 2017, Norton wrote a piece about Robert Scoble that described an alleged sexual assault by Scoble on Norton as well as another woman. Scoble denied what turned out to be multiple claims of assault, and said they were the result of his struggle with alcoholism. His response was met with a critical reaction.

== Personal life ==
Norton was married to journalist Danny O'Brien. They have a daughter. They divorced in 2007.

Norton dated computer programmer and activist Aaron Swartz for roughly three years, from 2007 until early 2011.

In 2016, Norton moved to Luxembourg to live with the man she eventually married in 2017.

Norton is bisexual and polyamorous.

== Selected works ==
- Norton, Quinn (17 November 2015). "That Time I Tweeted About #BlackGirlsAreMagic". Quinn Norton. Medium.
