= TurkHackTeam =

Turkish nationalist hacker group

- Formation: 2002
- Founder: Arsenik
- Type: Kemalist hacktivist group
- Official language: Turkish
- Website: https://www.turkhackteam.org/

TurkHackTeam is a Turkish nationalist hacker group founded in 2002. Ideologically they are Kemalists and define themselves as the "Turkish Cyber Army".

They state that their goal is to fight against all kinds of cyber threats against Turkey. They have appeared on news headlines on many international news portals.

== History ==
The group claimed responsibility for the hacking of the pro-Kurdish Democratic Society Party's website in 2008.

TurkHackTeam went on a spree of attacking Iranian and Russian websites in 2016 amid the Syrian civil war. During rising tensions in the Nagorno-Karabakh conflict, they participated in cyberwarfare against Armenian hackers. In 2017, for unknown reasons, they hacked the official website of the UK Police. In March 2017, during a brief period of tensions between the Netherlands and Turkey, the TurkHackTeam launched their "Netherlands Operation" where they hacked and defaced over 250 Dutch websites in less than a month.

They also hacked Star Alliance. TurkHackTeam is also a platform that prepares social projects. The first of the projects was to send morale letters to the soldiers and police after the 2016 Turkish coup attempt. In the same year, they distributed food in Africa through an association. Later, some group members gathered on 10 November and went to visit Anıtkabir, the mausoleum of Mustafa Kemal Atatürk. In 2017, the group, which collected books from its members, donated these books to secondary and high schools, and created libraries.

At the beginning of February 2024, the hacker group claimed responsibility for the attack on La Poste and Crédit Agricole. According to the first elements this is a Denial-of-service attack. They also stood out in 2023 for hacking the ANSSI Telegram page.
