= Timeline of events associated with Anonymous =

Anonymous is a decentralised virtual community. They are commonly referred to as an internet-based collective of hacktivists whose goals, like its organization, are decentralized. Anonymous seeks mass awareness and revolution against what the group perceives as corrupt entities, while attempting to maintain anonymity. Anonymous has had a hacktivist impact. This is a timeline of activities reported to have been carried out by the group.

== 2007 ==
- January: Radio host Hal Turner sued several online groups, alleging Anonymous "posted unauthorized copies of his radio shows online, attacked [his] server so as to make it unavailable, and placed unauthorised orders for goods, services and merchandise from third parties in [his] name." The case was dismissed in December for lack of response.
- December: A man was arrested in Toronto on charges of luring a child under the age of 14, attempting to invite sexual touching, attempted exposure, and other charges. Police stated that Anonymous, a cyber-vigilante group which trolls for pedophiles and then "outs" them, had targeted the suspect before law enforcement was involved, and cautioned that such interference could impede official investigations.

== 2008 ==
- January 14: Anonymous declared war on the Church of Scientology and bombarded them with DDoS attacks, harassing phone calls, black faxes, and Google bombing.
- February–December: Known as Project Chanology, Anonymous organized multiple in-person pickets in front of Churches of Scientology world-wide, starting February 10 and running throughout the year, achieving coordinated pickets in over 100 cities, thousands of protestors, and wearing Guy Fawkes masks.
- March 28: The Epilepsy Foundation's forum was salted with posts displaying flashing computer animations with the intention of triggering seizures in photosensitive and pattern-sensitive epileptics. There was some evidence pointing to Anonymous, but Anonymous named other likely culprits including the Church of Scientology seeking to discredit Anonymous. (See also Epilepsy Foundation § 2008 forum invasion)
- June: Anonymous claimed responsibility for attacking and defacing websites and forums of SOHH (Support Online Hip Hop) and AllHipHop, causing the sites to temporarily shut down. They also stole personal information about SOHH employees. (See also SOHH § Defacement.)
- September 16: Anonymous declared they hacked the private email account of Sarah Palin. An individual was convicted and sentenced to a year in federal prison. (See also Sarah Palin email hack.)

== 2009 ==
- January: Anonymous targeted California teen McKay Hatch who runs the No Cussing Club, a website against profanity. Hatch's home address, phone number, and other personal information were leaked on the internet, and his family received hate mail, obscene phone calls, bogus pizza deliveries, and pornography through the mail.
- June: Anonymous and Pirate Bay set up a website for Iranians to communicate and coordinate online for the 2009 Iranian presidential election protests and the Iranian Green Movement by bypassing the government's internet censorship in Iran.
- September 9: Anonymous temporarily shut down the website of the Prime Minister of Australia with a denial-of-service attack as a warning in protest against the government's plan to filter the internet.

== 2010 ==
- January: Anonymous attacked websites of the governments of Tunisia and Zimbabwe over censorship issues related to WikiLeaks.
- February 10: Anonymous conducted DDoS attacks against a wide range of Australian government servers in protest of proposed internet filtering legislation which would block some pornography. Australian anti-censorship groups complained that the attack only hurt their cause, and Australian government members dismissed the attack and said that they would just restore the service when the attack finished. (See also February 2010 Australian cyberattacks.)
- July: Anonymous flooded the Oregon Tea Party's Facebook page when they found out that OTP had been using part of Anonymous' slogan, "We Are Legion". OTP surrendered, apologized and recanted.
- July: In response to Chelsea Manning's imprisonment and treatment after leaking classified information to WikiLeaks, Anonymous threatened to disrupt activities at Marine Corps Brig, Quantico by cyber-attacking communications, exposing private information of personnel, and other harassment methods. Military spokespersons responded that the threat has been referred to law enforcement and counterterrorism officials and requested an investigation.
- September: Anonymous targeted major pro-copyright and anti-piracy organizations, law firms, individuals, and entertainment industry websites in retaliation for DDoS attacks on torrent sites. (See also Operation Payback.)
- December: Anonymous started DDoS attacks on websites of companies who had withdrawn banking facilities from WikiLeaks including Amazon, PayPal, BankAmerica, Swiss bank PostFinance, MasterCard, and Visa. Over the next year, dozens were arrested and several convicted for their part in the operation. (See also Operation Payback § Operation Avenge Assange and Anonymous (hacker group) § Operation Avenge Assange.)
- December: Anonymous promoted sifting through WikiLeaks to identify potentially overlooked cables, making short videos covering the topic, and flooding the internet with them.

== 2011 ==
- January 3: Anonymous got involved during the Tunisian Revolution and engaged in DDoS attacks on key Tunisian websites—including the president, prime minister, ministry of industry, ministry of foreign affairs, and the stock exchange—taking down at least 8 websites and defacing several others. Anonymous distributed information and scripts to help Tunisians bypass government censorship, and Anonymous' own website also came under DDoS attack.
- January 9: Anonymous hacked and defaced the website of Fine Gael, an Irish political party.
- February 5–6: The CEO of security firm HBGary announced they had successfully infiltrated Anonymous. In retaliation, Anonymous hacked and vandalized the company's website, took control of the company's e-mail, and took down the phone system. Anonymous also hacked the CEO's Twitter account and doxed him online.
- February 16: Anonymous engaged in a flame war with Westboro Baptist Church, resulting in a DDoS attack on WBC's godhatesfags.com website.
- February 27: As part of the 2011 Wisconsin protests, Anonymous knocked offline the website for the Koch brother's Americans for Prosperity.
- March 14: Anonymous threatened to release Bank of America emails purported to show evidence of fraud in the force-placed insurance market. The emails were alleged to have come from a former employee of a subsidiary to Bank of America.
- April: Anonymous attacked Sony websites in response to the lawsuit Sony Computer Entertainment America, Inc. v. Hotz, resulting in the 2011 PlayStation Network outage.
- June 6: Anonymous claimed to have hacked India's National Informatics Centre in support of Ramdev, defacing it.
- June 12: Anonymous claimed responsibility for a DDoS attack of the website of the National Police Corps of Spain, asserting it was a legitimate form of peaceful protest in retaliation for the arrest of three individuals alleged to be associated with acts of cyber civil disobedience attributed to Anonymous.
- June 15: The group launched DDoS attacks on ninety-one Malaysian government websites in retaliation for their censoring of websites.
- June 20: Members of the group took down the websites of the Orlando, Florida Chamber of Commerce and inserted a message into the website of the Universal Orlando Resort requesting that users "boycott Orlando". The group did so in response to the arrests of members of Food Not Bombs for feeding the homeless in Lake Eola Park against city ordinances. The group had planned and announced the attack on their IRC channel. The group has vowed to take a different Orlando-related website offline every day, and have also targeted the re-election website of Mayor of Orlando Buddy Dyer and the Orlando International Airport. A member of the group left a Guy Fawkes mask outside of the mayor's home; the police are treating the picture taken of the mask as a threat against the mayor. On July 11, the group took down the website of the Roman Catholic Diocese of Orlando and the Rotary Club of Orlando.
- June 20: Operation AntiSec — The group collaborated with LulzSec to hack the websites of a number of government and corporate sources and release information from them. As well as targeting American sites, Anonymous also targeted government sites in Tunisia, Anguilla, Brazil, Zimbabwe, Turkey, and Australia. On July 21, Anonymous released two documents allegedly taken from NATO.
- June 28: Anonymous announced that within the next 24 hours, it would hack into the website of the Knesset, the legislature of Israel, and knock it offline. It was stated that the planned attacks were a response to alleged hacking attacks by Israeli intelligence such as the Stuxnet virus, a computer virus which allegedly was created by Israeli and U.S. intelligence and targeted the Iranian nuclear program.
- August: Someone announced "Operation Facebook", an alleged plan to take down Facebook on November 5, 2011. It was an attempted revival of an earlier OpFacebook that was also abandoned.
- August: Operation BART — After Bay Area Rapid Transit shut down cell phone service in an attempt to disconnect protesters from assembling after a police shooting, Anonymous sent out a mass email/fax bomb to BART personnel and organized multiple mass in-person protests at the network's Civic Center station. Anonymous also hacked the BART website, and released the personal information of 102 BART police officers, as well as account information for about 2,000 customers.
- August: Dubbed "Shooting Sheriffs Saturday," Anonymous hacked 70 (mostly rural) law enforcement websites and released 10 GB of leaked emails, social security numbers of police, training files, informant information and other information.
- August: Anonymous hacked the Syrian Ministry of Defense website and replaced it with an image of the pre-Ba'athist flag, a symbol of the pro-democracy movement in the country, as well as a message supporting the 2011 Syrian uprising and calling on members of the Syrian Army to defect to protect protesters.
- August 17: (Operation Pharisee) Anonymous organized efforts against the Vatican's websites, coinciding with World Youth Day 2011. Hacking was unsuccessful and a two-day DDoS attack failed to slow the website.
- October: Operation DarkNet — Anonymous DDoSed 40 child porn sites, published the usernames of over 1500 people frequenting one of those websites, and invited the U.S. Federal Bureau of Investigation and Interpol to follow up.
- October 6: Op Cartel — Anonymous claimed Mexican drug cartel Los Zetas had kidnapped one of the group's members, demanded the hostage be freed, and threatened to publish personal information about members of the cartel and their collaborators in politics, police, military, and business. The website of Gustavo Rosario Torres, a former Tabasco state prosecutor, was defaced with a message suggesting his involvement with the organization. Anonymous claimed in early November that the victim had been freed, but reporters did not find evidence of Anonymous involvement and noted a lack of details and police reports. The Veracruz state attorney general couldn't confirm the kidnapping.
- November 7: (Operation Brotherhood Takedown) Anonymous threatened to take down the websites of the Muslim Brotherhood, and on November 12 the Muslim Brotherhood announced that four websites were temporarily taken down by a DDoS attack.
- November 22: In response to the UC Davis pepper-spray incident, Anonymous released the personal information of the officer that pepper-sprayed protestors.
- December 24: (Stratfor email leak) Anonymous claimed they stole thousands of e-mail addresses and credit card information from security firm Stratfor. The hackers included Jeremy Hammond, who worked with Anonymous to release Stratfor's 5,543,061 emails to WikiLeaks. The emails revealed Stratfor's surveillance of groups such as Occupy Wall Street and protestors of the Bhopal disaster.

== 2012 ==
- January: Anonymous hacked the website of the California Statewide Law Enforcement Association and released information about its members' identities, addresses, and credit cards.
- January 13: The Nigerian Economic and Financial Crimes Commission website was hacked, with a false report of the arrest of people involved in the oil sector replacing the normal page.
- January 19: (Operation Megaupload) Almost immediately after enforcement actions were taken against Megaupload including arresting four workers, Anonymous DDoSed numerous websites including those of the US Department of Justice, US Copyright Office, FBI, MPAA, Warner Brothers Music, RIAA, HADOPI, and Universal Music Group (the company responsible for the lawsuit against Megaupload).
- January 21: (Operation Anti-Acta) A series of DDoS attacks on Polish government websites took place, for which the Anonymous took responsibility and referred to as "the Polish Revolution", stating it was in revenge for the upcoming signing of the Anti-Counterfeiting Trade Agreement (ACTA) agreement by the Polish government. Websites affected include those of the Prime Minister of Poland, the lower house of parliament, and the ZAiKS copyright association.
- February: (Operation Russia) Anonymous hackers obtained access to the emails of several prominent pro-Kremlin activists and officials including Vasily Yakemenko, head of the Federal Agency for Youth Affairs, Kristina Potupchik, press secretary for the Nashi youth movement, and Oleg Khorokhordin, deputy head of the Department for Internal Affairs at the Presidential Administration. Twitter account @OP_Russia posted links to copies of the emails, which disclosed how some influential bloggers and trolls had been paid to post pro-Putin comments and stories on negative press articles on the internet.
- February 3: Anonymous hacked and defaced the Boston Police Department's website. BPD responded with their own deadpan humor video.
- February 3: Anonymous leaked a recorded conference call between FBI and Scotland Yard officials discussing hacking investigations.
- February 8: Anonymous hacked the Syrian Ministry of Presidential Affairs' email server, accessing dozens of staff inboxes.
- February 10: Anonymous claimed responsibility for taking down the CIA website for several hours.
- February 29: After Interpol announced arrests of 25 suspected Anonymous members, its website briefly went down in an apparent cyberattack.
- March 4: Anonymous took down the American Israel Public Affairs Committee website; AIPAC did not comment on the incident.
- March 6: Donncha O'Cearbhaill was charged in connection with the leaked FBI–Scotland Yard call in February, and released the next day.
- March 7: A DDoS attack by Anonymous temporarily brought down the official website of the Vatican.
- March 8: People claiming to be part of Anonymous leaked source code for older versions of Norton AntiVirus and Norton Utilities.
- March 12: A second DDoS attack by Anonymous brought down the Vatican's official website for several hours, and the group also hacked Vatican Radio and accessed its database.
- March 16: Anonymous took down Monsanto's Hungarian website, which remained offline until March 26.
- March 21: Anonymous stole 1.7GB of data from the United States Bureau of Justice Statistics, including internal emails and a full database dump.
- April 5: Anonymous hacked 485 Chinese government websites, some repeatedly, to protest the government's treatment of citizens.
- April 21: Anonymous defaced the official Formula One website to protest the 2012 Bahrain Grand Prix amid ongoing anti‑government unrest in Bahrain.
- April 21: Anonymous Philippines defaced the China University Media Union website in response to the University of the Philippines hack and the Scarborough Shoal dispute.
- May 17: Anonymous attacked the websites of the India Supreme Court and the ruling Congress party in protest of ISP blocks on video and file‑sharing sites.
- May 20: Anonymous launched Opération Québec in response to the adoption of Bill 78 following weeks of student protests, releasing a video criticizing the law and urging the Liberal Party of Quebec to allow public demonstrations. On May 21, Anonymous DDoSed the websites of the Liberal Party of Quebec, the Ministry of Public Security of Quebec, and a government police‑ethics site.
- May 30: Anonymous threatened to disrupt the upcoming Canadian Grand Prix and claimed to have accessed personal information from the F1 website. Then on also May 30, Anonymous leaked a two‑hour video filmed in Sagard, Quebec, showing a 2008 birthday celebration for Jacqueline Desmarais attended by prominent political and cultural figures.
- June 8: (Operation Cyprus) Anonymous released a video announcing plans to target the government of Cyprus. On June 26, DDoS attacks took down 47 websites belonging to the Republic of Cyprus for about 15 hours. The government stated that Anonymous was responsible.
- June 26: (Operation Japan) The website of the Japan Business Federation was taken offline. Anonymous claimed responsibility and referred to the action as part of "Operation Japan". The incident followed amendments to Japan's copyright laws that increased penalties for illegal downloading.
- July: Anonymous hacked Australian ISP AAPT and leaked 40 GB of partially redacted customer data. The incident was described as a protest against data retention policy.
- July 6: As part of the Yo Soy 132 protest movement, the Mexican branch of Anonymous defaced the website of the PRI party and left anti‑fraud slogans. On July 20, a second PRI‑related website was defaced by the Mexican branch of Anonymous, again connected to the Yo Soy 132 movement. The attackers replaced the page with an image of president‑elect Peña Nieto and anti‑fraud slogans.
- July 9: Anonymous provided WikiLeaks with more than 2.4 million Syrian government emails.
- July 25: (Operation Anaheim) Anonymous released personal information belonging to several Anaheim police officials, including the police chief, during an online protest related to the Anaheim police shooting.
- August 10: (Operation Myanmar) Anonymous carried out DDoS attacks and defaced more than 100 Myanmar websites, allegedly in reaction to killing Muslim Rohingya in Myanmar. Myanmar‑based hackers conducted counterattacks.
- August 13: Anonymous hacked two Uganda government websites. The incident was described as a protest against the country's strict anti‑gay laws.
- September: Anonymous claimed responsibility for leaking government documents and taking down the website of Hong Kong's National Education Centre during protests over the proposed Moral and National Education curriculum.
- September 26: Anonymous Philippines defaced several government websites, including those of the Bangko Sentral ng Pilipinas and the Philippine National Police, in actions described as opposition to the Cybercrime Prevention Act of 2012. Additional defacements occurred on October 1 in an action referred to as "Bloody Monday". In February 2014, the Philippine Supreme Court ruled parts of the law unconstitutional.
- November 17: Anonymous claimed it deployed a "Great Oz" firewall to prevent alleged US election tampering.
- December 16: Anonymous reposted names, addresses, and emails of prominent members of the Westboro Baptist Church after the group announced plans to picket the funerals of the victims of the Sandy Hook Elementary School shooting. Anonymous also carried out DDoS attacks on the church's website, accessed social media accounts belonging to members, and created a whitehouse.gov petition to classify the church as a hate group.

== 2013 ==
- January 2: Anonymous released an incriminating video, photographs, tweets, and hacked emails related to the Steubenville High School football team during the investigation of the Steubenville High School rape case.
- January 13: Anonymous Mexico penetrated the website of the Mexico army, SEDENA, disclosed information including usernames and passwords, and replaced the site content with a video referencing riots during Peña Nieto's presidential inauguration and the Zapatista Army of National Liberation. (See also: Yo Soy 132)
- January 26: Anonymous defaced the website of the United States Sentencing Commission multiple times following the suicide of Aaron Swartz, causing the site to crash under heavy traffic. Swartz had been accused of stealing materials from the Massachusetts Institute of Technology with intent to distribute them freely.
- February 3: Anonymous hacked the Federal Reserve and released data obtained from the breach.
- March: During the 2013 Lahad Datu standoff, cyberattacks were exchanged between Philippine and Malaysian hacking groups. Philippine sources reported that Malaysian hackers defaced Philippine websites and posted threats. In response, the Philippine Cyber Army defaced 175 Malaysian websites, including state-owned pages. McAfee researchers later listed the Philippine Cyber Army as a global hacktivist threat, noting its ties to Anonymous.
- April: After Cleveland police fired 137 rounds at a car in December 2012, killing its two occupants, Anonymous released personal information of the officers involved in April 2013. Twelve officers were later fired or disciplined, and criminal charges were considered by a grand jury.
- April 2: Anonymous announced "Operation Free Korea," calling for political changes in North Korea and threatening cyberattacks if demands were not met. On April 3, the group claimed to have stolen 15,000 user passwords. On April 4, Anonymous claimed responsibility for hacking the Uriminzokkiri website and its associated Twitter and Flickr accounts. A defaced image of Kim Jong Un was posted on the group's Flickr page, and The Jester (hacktivist) separately claimed attacks on Air Koryo and other North Korean sites. On June 22, Anonymous claimed to have stolen North Korean military documents and said they would be released on June 25, though no documents were published. (See also: 2013 Korean crisis and Cyberactivism in North Korea)
- April 6: (OpIsrael) Anonymous-affiliated groups and other anti-Israel actors carried out coordinated cyberattacks against Israeli websites to coincide with Holocaust Remembrance Day. The campaign consisted mainly of denial of service attacks and targeted government, banking, media, and small business websites. Most attacks were repelled, though the Central Bureau of Statistics site may have been briefly taken offline. Some sites were defaced with anti-Israel slogans, while various social media accounts associated with the attackers made false claims of large-scale damage, including fabricated financial losses and nationwide outages. Israeli hackers responded by taking down the OpIsrael website, replacing it with pro-Israel messages and the national anthem Hatikvah, and by targeting sites associated with Hezbollah, Islamic Jihad, and individuals involved in the operation.
- April 12: Following the suicide of Rehtaeh Parsons, Anonymous threatened to release personal information about individuals alleged to have assaulted her, but later withdrew the threat after a request from Parsons' mother. The group also held protests outside the Royal Canadian Mounted Police headquarters in Halifax. (See also: Anonymous muscle in on Canadian teen rape case at Wikinews)
- May 10: After a Philippine Coast Guard vessel fired on the Taiwanese fishing boat Guang Da Xing No. 28 on May 9, killing a fisherman, hackers identifying as "AnonTAIWAN" attacked Philippine government websites and leaked account information. The attacks caused disruptions to government websites during the Philippine general election.
- May 28: Anonymous published personal information belonging to members of the English Defence League (a far right street protest movement) in what the group described as an effort to destroy the organization.
- June 7: Anonymous released documents they described as secret NSA files, though the materials were already publicly available.
- June 30: After a Hawthorne, California police officer shot a dog during an arrest, Anonymous issued a video threat directed at the police department. The city website also experienced a DDoS attack, though it is unclear whether Anonymous was responsible.
- July 4: Anonymous hacked the national website of Nigeria after the passage of legislation imposing prison sentences of up to 14 years for same-sex relationships.
- July: Anonymous NZ conducted DDoS attacks on the website of the Government Communications Security Bureau, websites linked to the New Zealand National Party, and on websites belonging to politicians who supported legislation expanding the agency's surveillance powers.
- August–November: (Operation Singapore) Between August 20 and November 5, Anonymous carried out attacks on multiple Singaporean websites, including those of Ang Mo Kio Town Council, the National Museum of Singapore—from which they leaked 3,600 emails, IP addresses, and names—PAP Community Foundation, and The Straits Times. (See also: 2013 Singapore cyberattacks)
- November: Anonymous Philippines hacked 115 government websites during protests against the Priority Development Assistance Fund (PDAF), prompting investigations by Philippine law enforcement agencies. The NBI was ordered to investigate the attacks. Some senators downplayed the incidents but acknowledged the grievances raised, while Senator Trillanes IV expressed concern about the potential impact of such attacks on government systems.

== 2014 ==
- April: (#OpJustina) Anonymous carried out DDoS attacks against Boston Children's Hospital in connection with the custody case of Justina Pelletier. A member involved in the attacks was later arrested while attempting to flee to Cuba.
- August 10: (Operation Ferguson) Anonymous released a video criticizing the Ferguson, Missouri, police following the Shooting of Michael Brown and warned of retaliation if protesters were harmed. On August 12, Anonymous released personal information belonging to St. Louis County Police Chief Jon Belmar after he declined to release the name of the officer involved in the shooting and dismissed the group's threats. The group also released incorrect information claiming to identify the officer who shot Brown.
- October 1: (Operation Hong Kong) Anonymous released a video announcing cyberattacks against the Government of Hong Kong in response to police actions during the 2014 Hong Kong protests. The group expressed support for the protesters and threatened to target government websites and databases. On October 2, Hong Kong media reported that Anonymous had taken over several company websites. The Hong Kong Government stated that its systems remained functional and that cyber defenses had been strengthened.
- November 8: (Operation Infosurge) Anonymous Leyte defaced and disrupted Philippine government websites to protest the government's response to Typhoon Haiyan (also called Super Typhoon Yolanda). More than 10 websites were defaced and 33 others were rendered inaccessible for up to seven hours. A week earlier, the Department of Trade and Industry had been hacked, with about 2,000 email addresses, usernames, and password hashes leaked online. The operation coincided with the anniversary of Typhoon Haiyan, which saw protests from various online groups.

== 2015 ==
- January: Anonymous launched Operation Death Eaters, calling for public assistance in compiling information about alleged international child abuse networks.
- January 9: Following the Charlie Hebdo shooting, Anonymous released a statement offering condolences, condemning the attack as an assault on freedom of expression, and announcing plans to target jihadist websites and social media accounts linked to Islamic terrorism.
- February 11: Anonymous altered the online configuration of at least one automated fuel tank gauge, changing its label from "DIESEL" to "WE_ARE_LEGION". Reports noted that such access could allow a hacker to disrupt station operations by falsifying fuel levels, triggering alarms, or locking operators out of the system.
- April 2: (Operation Stop Reclamation) Anonymous Philippines attacked and defaced 132 Chinese government, educational, and commercial websites in response to China's reclamation activities in disputed areas of the South China Sea.
- July 19: After a man wearing a Guy Fawkes mask was shot and killed by a Royal Canadian Mounted Police officer on July 17, Anonymous-affiliated accounts announced Operation Anon Down. The RCMP website was reported inaccessible nationwide on July 19.
- July 21: (Operation StormFront) Anonymous released a video announcing plans to attack the white supremacist website Stormfront due to its racist and extremist content. The attack was scheduled for August 1.
- October 22: (Operation KKK) Anonymous-associated accounts claimed to have accessed a KKK-linked Twitter account and announced plans to expose identifying information for up to 1,000 KKK members. Subsequent releases included several hundred names and social media profiles.

== 2016 ==
- March 27: Philippines Commission on Elections data breach. Hacker arrested.
- October 21: DDoS attacks on Dyn
- December: Anonymous engaged in online activism for a year with DDoS attacks against the Government of Thailand and Ministry of Information and Communication Technology websites to pressure the government to stop pending legislation that would add amendments to the Computer Crime Act and effectively build a Thai version of China's Great Firewall. In December, Anonymous breached the websites of the Thai Police, Ministry of Defence, and Ministry of Tourism and Sports, after which 9 hackers were arrested.

== 2017 ==
- February: A hacker broke into the servers of dark web hosting company Freedom Hosting II, discovered that half of their client's websites were child pornography or other illegal activities, stole information, publicly dumped it, and compromised the company's servers. Security experts later noted that the Tor network had shrunk by 15-20%.

== 2019 ==
- November: Allegedly in retaliation for the siege of the Hong Kong Polytechnic University, Anonymous hacked various Chinese websites, and revealed personal identity information about government employees and corporate data.
- December: Anonymous gained access to six email accounts of the Chilean Army and revealed information related to intelligence, operations, finances and international relations from 2015 to 2019.

== 2020 ==
- May 28: (#PLDTHacked) Anonymous Philippines hacked into the Twitter account of PLDT's customer service, changed the profile's name to "PLDT Doesn't Care", and posted a message which began "As the pandemic arises, Filipinos need fast internet to communicate with their loved ones. Do your job."
- May 28: Shortly after the murder of George Floyd, Anonymous posted a video addressing police brutality and supporting the Black Lives Matter movement. Two days later, the websites of the Minneapolis Police Department and the City of Minneapolis experienced DDoS attacks.
- June 1: Anonymous Brasil posted personal, location and financial information on Brazilian president Jair Bolsonaro, his family, and his cabinet. They also published information about billionaire businessman Luciano Hang.
- June 19: Anonymous claimed responsibility for stealing a trove of documents and leaking the 269-gigabyte collection through DDoSecrets. See BlueLeaks.
- November 20: The Uganda Police website was down for a number of days. Anonymous claimed credit and said it was in response to the violent crackdown on protesters following the arrest of presidential candidate Bobi Wine.

== 2021 ==
- January: (#OpsWakeUp21) Eleven Anonymous Malaysia suspects were arrested after they hacked and defaced 17 websites of local governments and universities.
- February: Data breach of domain registrar Epik, a preferred hosting site for many far-right websites which had been kicked off of other webhosting sites. (See 2021 Epik data breach)
- September 3: Anonymous announces #OperationJane to sabotage websites related to the recently passed Texas Heartbeat Act.
- September 11: Hack and defacement of Texas Republican Party's website.
- September 13: Release of hundreds of gigabytes of personal information of Epik's customers, customer's credit card information, internal company emails, and other information. A further 300 gigabytes of Epik's data were released on September 29 and October 4 including bootable disk images. (See 2021 Epik data breach)
- September: Twitter suspended the account of Anonymous Germany (@AnonNewsDE) after they hacked accounts of conspiracy theorist Attila Hildmann and doxxed him on Twitter.
- December 21: Anonymous Brazil hacked the website of the Brumadinho City Hall and left a video in remembrance of the dam disaster that occurred on 25 January 2019 which caused the deaths of 270 people.

== 2022 ==
- Anonymous conducted numerous cyber-operations against Russia starting February when the Russian invasion of Ukraine began. Most of the actions were theft and publication of Russian emails and data. See Anonymous and the Russian invasion of Ukraine.

== 2023 ==
- October 7: Hackers engaged in several online disruptions to Israeli systems including a DDoS attack on Israel's Red Alert app which provides real-time rocket information to citizens. Anonymous Global issued a warning to Israeli Prime Minister Benjamin Netanyahu about the Gaza war.

== 2024 ==
- March: Anonymous threatened to publish 7 gigabytes of data they alleged to have stolen during a hack of Israel's Shimon Peres Negev Nuclear Research Center.
- September 22: Anonymous in Indonesia claimed to have connected a controversial online account named "fufufafa" to Vice President-elect Gibran Rakabuming Raka after hacking the website of the Directorate General of Population and Civil Registration, then publicly disclosed Gibran's alleged personal and contact information, including a driver's licence number.

== See also ==
- Anonymous (group)
