= Barrett Brown =

American journalist, essayist and activist (born 1981)

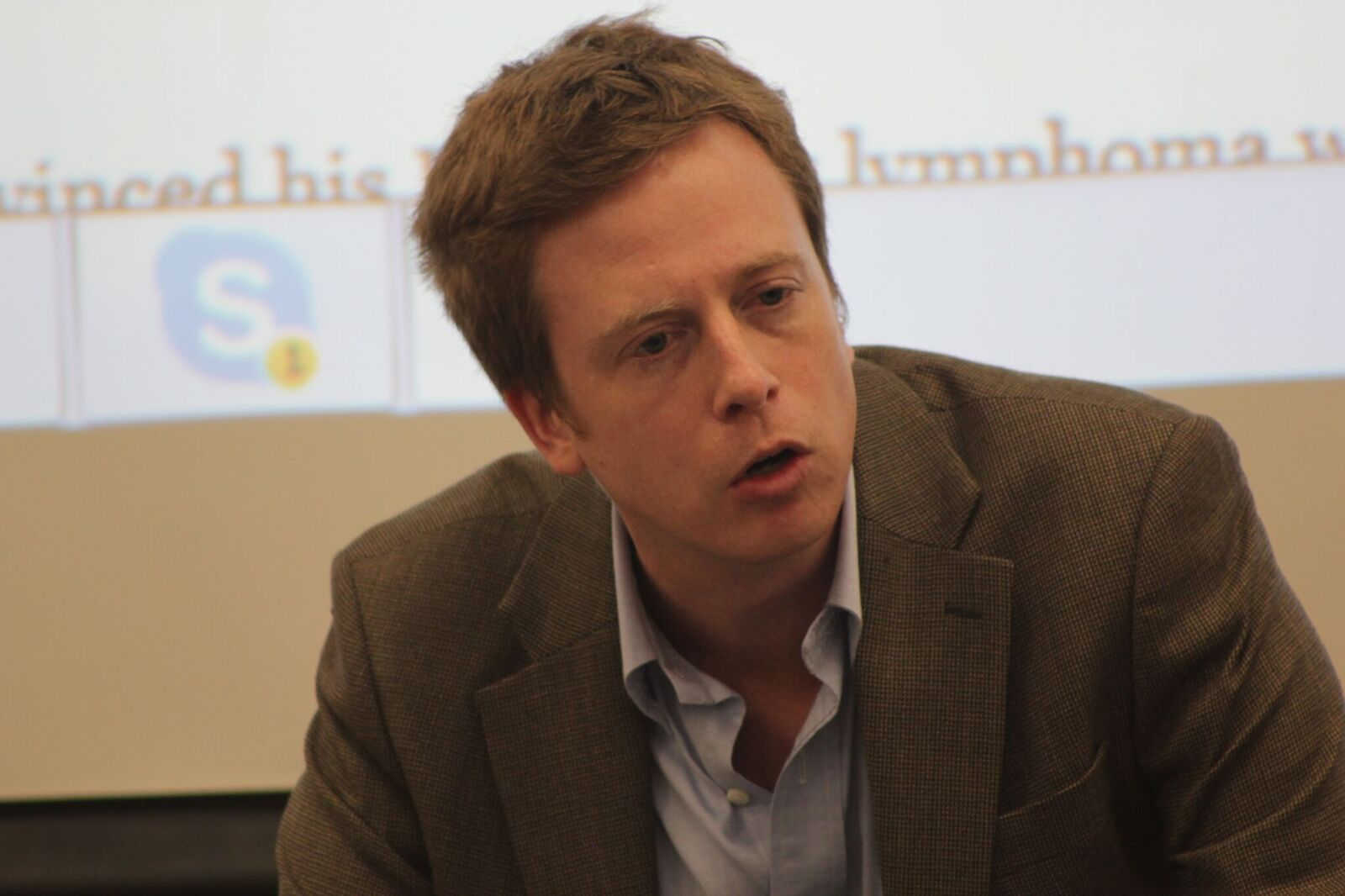
- Brown in 2017
- Born: Barrett Lancaster Brown; August 14, 1981 (age 45); Dallas, Texas
- Occupations: Writer, hacktivist, journalist
- Agent: Anonymous
- Movement: Anarchism
- Criminal charges: Threatening a federal officer, obstruction of justice, and accessory after the fact (2014), intentional harassment, alarm or distress (2021)
- Criminal penalty: 63 months in federal prison, $890,250 in fines and restitution (2014), £1,200 fine (2021)
- Awards: National Magazine Award

Barrett Lancaster Brown (born August 14, 1981) is an American anarchist, hacktivist, writer, and associate of Anonymous. He is mainly known for his role alongside Anonymous during the early 2010s, including during the Stratfor email leak.

Born in a wealthy family, Brown grew up opposed to authority, before becoming a freelance writer for various media outlets. In 2009, he founded Project PM, a crowdfunded investigation wiki. Around that time, he also started working with Anonymous and being one of their associates, helping them during some of their actions, such as during the Tunisian revolution or against the Australian government. In 2011–2012, he was involved in the Stratfor email leak, during which hacktivists managed to obtain and publish thousands of intelligence documents related to the, among others, American military-industrial complex. In 2012, the FBI executed search warrants at his home and later arrested him, also targeting his mother.

Three years later, in January 2015, Brown was ultimately sentenced to more than 5 years in federal prison after pleading guilty to accessory after the fact, obstruction of justice, and threatening a federal officer stemming from the FBI's investigation into the 2012 Stratfor email leak. After his release, he would later be involved in Pursuance, a platform trying to link activists together, before moving to the United Kingdom.

Brown has written for Vanity Fair, The Guardian, the Huffington Post, The Onion and other outlets. In 2016, he won a National Magazine Award for a series of jailhouse memoirs published in D Magazine and The Intercept. He published a memoir, My Glorious Defeats, in 2024.

== Biography ==
=== Early life ===
Brown was born and grew up in Dallas County. His father Robert was a wealthy real estate investor until the FBI investigated him for fraud and he lost the family's money. Robert Brown was charged in a real-estate-fraud scheme, but the charges were eventually dropped. His parents divorced when he was 7. After the divorce he lived with his mother Karen Lancaster. His young life would have been marked by the example of his father and resistance to authority.

Brown exhibited an early interest in writing and journalism, creating his own newspapers on his family's computer while attending Preston Hollow Elementary School where he was the poet laureate. He went on to contribute to his school newspapers, and interned at several weekly newspapers during his teenage years. While in middle school, he began exploring the possibilities of online networks and reading Ayn Rand. He attended the Episcopal School of Dallas through his sophomore year of high school, where he created the Objectivists Club and placed second in a national Ayn Rand essay contest.

In 1998, Brown spent his would-be junior year in Tanzania with his father who was residing there for a logging business and safari hunting. While in Africa, Brown completed high school online through a Texas Tech University program, earning college credits as well as his high school diploma. In 2000 he enrolled at the University of Texas at Austin and spent two semesters taking writing courses before leaving school to pursue a full-time career as a freelance writer.

=== Early career ===
After dropping out of college, Brown remained in Austin freelancing and taking various writing jobs. He's stated he started out just wanting to write humor. In 2007 his book Flock of Dodos: Behind Modern Creationism, Intelligent Design, and the Easter Bunny, co-authored with Jon P. Alston, was published. In that same year, Brown and a group of friends moved to Brooklyn where their apartment was a hang out spot which included a group of marijuana dealers. He wrote columns for Vanity Fair and The Onion and other publications but much of what he published was on blogs like the Daily Kos for which he was not paid.

During this time, Brown started spending more time online and his heroin use increased which he had used on and off with since he was 19. Becoming a griefer in Second Life, he socialized with other griefers on imageboards like 4chan and the wiki Encyclopedia Dramatica with whom he collaborated to harass other users and coordinate elaborate pranks. Though not a hacker himself, the hackers he associated with would later be known as Anonymous. Brown wrote that he "became obsessed with the question of what would happen when these people realized what they were capable of."

By December 2009, Brown was living on a couch at a friend's apartment in Brooklyn, spending most of his time online and shooting heroin. In the spring of 2010, he moved back to Dallas and entered outpatient treatment for his addiction. As part of his treatment he was prescribed Suboxone, a synthetic opioid.

=== Association with Anonymous ===
Brown began working with Anonymous after watching it form into a hackivist collective with their 2008 attacks on the Church of Scientology. Following Operation Titstorm in February 2010 which Anonymous launched denial-of-service attacks against the Australian government, he wrote the article “Anonymous, Australia, and the Inevitable Fall of the Nation-State” in The Huffington Post explaining Anonymous and reasons for the attacks. Because those involved with Anonymous would not reveal their name, Brown became the de facto contact for media whose inquiries were previously being fielded by Gregg Housh. He gave interviews on major TV networks and various media outlets and considered himself "information operations" for the group, though he was often erroneously referred to by the media as their spokesperson or similar. Rolling Stone stated "part of his appeal was the act of his drily affected pseudo-aristocratic-asshole persona, which he exaggerated during media appearances"

With Operation Tunisia starting in January 2011 which Anonymous supported the Arab Spring by attacking the Tunisian government, Brown become directly involved by creating a guide for protesters. Barrett Brown was also referenced by The Jester in some of their communications, where The Jester addressed him.

In May 2011, Brown announced he was stepping away from Anonymous to focus on Project PM citing the lack of quality control and some of their actions, such as Operation Sony, did not align with his aims.

In early October 2011 Anonymous launched OpCartel against the Zetas drug cartel and Mexican government then later claimed an Anonymous member was kidnapped by the cartel. In November, Brown said that 25,000 emails from the Mexican government containing the names of 75 members of the Zetas and associates would be released if a member of Anonymous kidnapped by the cartel was not set free. Anonymous later said the member released and called a truce. The New York Times raised doubts about the operation and kidnapping claim.

Brown stated he would continue the work to expose drug cartels and their associates and that he working with CNN on a story about a district attorney who was working with drug cartels. In his memoir, Brown wrote OpCartel "fizzled out" after he "made a few halfhearted efforts to obtain information" but that he "lacked the wherewithal to get anything accomplished" and was working through "a haze of opiates and mania" during the events.

=== Project PM ===
In 2009, Brown began work on his crowdsourced investigation wiki, Project PM. By Brown's count, Project PM had 75 members at its peak who communicated through an IRC chat room and published their findings on the Project PM wiki. The group dug through huge amounts of hacked files and emails from intelligence contractors, hoping to expose companies like HBGary and Stratfor, earning the trust of the hacktivist community. According to Project PM members, Brown and members sometimes pranked called research subjects at home.

In June 2011, he and Project PM released an exclusive report about a surveillance contract called "Romas/COIN" which was discovered in e-mails hacked from HBGary by Anonymous. It consisted of sophisticated data-mining techniques leveraging mobile software and aimed at Arab countries. After Project PM was shut down by his 2012 arrest and incarceration, he restarted it in late 2020 while seeking asylum in the UK.

=== Stratfor email leak ===
In December 2011, Brown told reporters that Anonymous had hacked millions of emails from Stratfor over Christmas and that they would be released by WikiLeaks. Brown suggested that Anonymous tell Stratfor they would "consider making any reasonable redactions to e-mails that might endanger, say, activists living under dictatorships" before emailing Stratfor CEO George Friedman directly. Brown didn't participate in the hack or know how to code but he did post a link in a chat which linked to documents already released online that contained email addresses and credit card information.

=== Arrest and sentencing ===
On March 6, 2012, the FBI executed search warrants at Brown's apartment and his mother's house. During the search, agents took possession of his laptop computers. The seized laptops included thousands of pages of chat logs from March 2011 to February 2012. These chats were produced as evidence in the trial against Jeremy Hammond and in Brown's trial.

On September 12, 2012, Brown was arrested in Dallas County, Texas for threatening an FBI agent in a YouTube video that has been called "unhinged". At his sentencing he stated he was going through "sudden withdrawal from paxil and suboxone" on the day he made the video.

A magistrate denied bail because he was judged "a danger to the safety of the community and a risk of flight." On October 3, 2012, a federal grand jury indictment was returned against Brown on charges of threats, conspiracy and retaliation against a federal law enforcement officer. Various tweets, YouTube uploads and comments made by Brown before his arrest were cited as support within the indictment.

In December 2012, Brown was indicted on an additional 12 federal charges related to the December 25, 2011 hack of Austin-based private intelligence company Stratfor. A trove of millions of Stratfor emails from the hack, including authentication information for thousands of credit card, was shared by the hacker collective LulzSec with WikiLeaks. Brown faced up to 45 years in federal prison for allegedly sharing a link to the data as part of Project PM. On January 23, 2013, a third indictment was filed against Brown on two counts of obstruction for concealing evidence during the March 6, 2012, FBI raid of his and his mother's homes. Brown's mother was sentenced on November 8, 2013, to six months of probation and a $1,000 fine for a misdemeanor charge of obstructing the execution of a search warrant. In September 2013, Brown was under a federal court-issued gag order. He faced at the time around 105 years in prison. The targeting of Brown's mother is cited by Taylor Owen as an example illustrating how state repression also affects the families of anarchist activists. In February 2014, he self-published the book Keep Rootin' for Putin: Establishment Pundits and the Twilight of American Competence.

In March 2014, most charges against Brown were dropped. In April 2014, Brown agreed to a plea bargain and plead guilty to accessory after the fact in the unauthorized access to a protected computer, threatening an FBI agent and obstructing the execution of a search warrant.

At sentencing, the government introduced additional chat logs seized from Brown's laptop. D Magazine wrote that the logs "painted Barrett as a leader of Anonymous, someone who knowingly stole and distributed credit card information, a wreaker of real and serious damage" in an attempt to secure a lengthy prison sentence. This caused further delays, as the defense was not given prior access. In January 2015, Brown was sentenced to 63 months in prison. He was also ordered to pay $890,250 in fines and restitution. Journalist Janus Kopfstein accused the government of making false statements about Brown before his sentencing. Much of Brown's December sentencing hearing was spent in drawn-out arguments over the definitions of Project PM and Brown himself.

=== Prison ===
During his incarceration, Brown published a series of jailhouse memoirs in D Magazine and The Intercept, for which he won a National Magazine Award in 2016. He publicly burned the award three years later in protest of The Intercept closing their Snowden archives.

Brown was released from prison on November 29, 2016, and moved into a halfway house close to downtown Dallas, Texas. Brown was ordered to pay at least $200 of his $890,000 restitution every month.

=== Continuation of activism, legal cases and conflict with Assange ===
In 2017, Brown launched the Pursuance Project, which aimed to unite transparency activists, investigative journalists, FOIA specialists and hacktivists in a fully encrypted platform. Brown said that Pursuance would take hacktivism into the future, letting anyone sort through troves of hacked documents and even recruit teams of hackers. This project was seen as a way to organize together from far distances and act together. Pursuance's goal was to offer task management and automation environment for collaborative investigations into the surveillance state. The Pursuance Project fizzled.

In February 2017, lawyers for donors to Brown's legal fund filed suit against Assistant United States Attorney Candina Heath for filing a subpoena against WePay that resulted in divulgence of their identities. The lawyers argued that the irrelevance of donor information to the case against Brown and the provision of the information directly to the Federal Bureau of Investigation rather than to the prosecutor or judge led to donors' belief that the information was intended to surveil and harass the donors for activity protected by the U.S. constitution, and filed for destruction of the data and monetary damages. On October 2, 2017, Judge Maria Elena James denied a motion to dismiss the case introduced by the Department of Justice.

In June 2017, the Department of Justice subpoenaed The Intercept for all communications and information on payments made to Brown. The Intercept's in-house counsel told the U.S. Attorney's Office that they would agree to turn over financial information but not communications between Brown and The Intercept. Brown suggested the subpoena related to restitution payments he was supposed to make, but commented that they should already have the information readily available. According to Brown, instead of using that information "they subpoenaed a media organization that they happen to have a great deal of interest in, The Intercept" which he called "an ill-thought-out fishing expedition".

In November 2017, Brown criticized Julian Assange for his secretive collaboration with the Trump campaign and then allegedly lying about it. Brown said Assange had acted "as a covert political operative", thus betraying WikiLeaks' focus on exposing "corporate and government wrongdoing". He considered the latter to be "an appropriate thing to do", but that "working with an authoritarian would-be leader to deceive the public is indefensible and disgusting".

In 2018, three trustees of the Courage Foundation decided to remove Brown from the Courage Foundation's beneficiary list over "nasty adversarial remarks" he had made about Julian Assange", In response, Courage Foundation Director Naomi Colvin quit in protest.

=== Move to the United Kingdom ===
Brown told The Sunday Times after briefly living in Antigua, he moved to the United Kingdom in November 2020. In April 2021, images and videos spread online of him holding a protest banner which said: "Kill Cops" near where an officer had been killed. Metropolitan Police tweeted they were trying to identify him and right-wing journalist Andy Ngô tweeted an accusation that he was "antifa-linked". Claims spread online that Brown was an undercover police officer, under police protection, or an agent provocateur. The Metropolitan Police told Reuters and Brown wrote online that the claims were false.

In May 2021, he was arrested on a canal boat in east London, being there since November 2020 to claim asylum, for overstaying his visa and two incitement offenses related to the banner. The arresting officer initially charged him under an incorrect code. An internal memo included a statement by Metropolitan Police Federation Chair Ken Marsh calling the banner "abhorrent, unacceptable, and dangerous behaviour" that could have resulted "in a tragedy." After he was released from the Barking and Dagenham Custody Centre on bail, he was detained by immigration authorities for overstaying his visa. He pleaded not guilty and was convicted of one charge of causing intentional, harassment alarm or distress and he was fined £1,200.

After Brown's asylum claim was denied in February 2024, he decided to fire his lawyer and appeal with another firm. Brown served on the advisory board of the International Modern Media Institute.

His memoir, My Glorious Defeats: Hacktivist, Narcissist, Anonymous, was published by Farrar, Straus and Giroux in July 2024.

== Personal life ==
=== Political views ===
Politically, Brown identifies as an anarchist and believes that the American government is corrupt and that the people are too complacent toward it. He sees the movement within Anonymous as an interesting collective for carrying out anarchist struggles starting from 2006, and argues that a wave of hacking would be an effective way to spread anarchist ideas and causes. He has described himself as an "anarchist revolutionary with a lust for insurgency" who "wanted to become famous for overthrowing things."

In 2019, Brown's Twitter account was permanently banned from Twitter four times. He has joked that he holds the record for most Twitter permanent bans. The first three bans were overturned. The fourth and final ban was prompted by Brown tweeting that Assange should not be on trial but that he would "deserve to die by other, cleaner hands" if he knew of Erik Prince's alleged ties to Roger Stone.

=== Others ===
Brown has talked publicly about his history of drug use and treatment, including methylphenidate in the third grade until it made him suicidal, then later sertraline. After moving to Brooklyn, he began smoking crack cocaine, using heroin and injecting suboxone. Brown has been diagnosed with severe ADHD and depression and describes himself as a narcissist, a role that plays up for comedic effect.

Brown has said he has been a drug addict "since early adolescence" and according to New York Magazine, Brown "gave a talk at Rutgers after a night of smoking crack and showed up high at the offices of the New York Observer." In 2010, Brown first began outpatient treatment for heroin addiction. In 2011, in response to concerns about his drug use, Brown said that “a lot of the rules don't apply to me. My heroin addiction is much different than everyone else's.” In 2012, he was still struggling with withdrawal. That summer, Brown's mental state deteriorated and he has testified that he was going through withdrawal on the day he made the video he was convicted for, and that he had induced a manic state by stopping taking Paxil.

In 2020, Brown went to rehab. After Brown's friend Kevin Gallagher died due to fentanyl and meth in June 2021, Brown's life spiraled and friendships and collaborations disintegrated as Brown accused them of being intelligence assets. In 2022, he attempted to commit suicide. In his memoir My Glorious Defeats: Hacktivist, Narcissist, Anonymous, Brown talks about his drug abuse and said "It is a particularity of the opiate-withdrawal process that, in one's desperation, one becomes highly receptive to stray enthusiasms."

== Legacy ==
=== Art ===
Barrett Brown's case was included as a plot point in Season 2 of the U.S. TV series House of Cards because of input from Brown's friend and fellow Anonymous member, Gregg Housh.

According to NPR, Brown could have served as a basis for Eliott from the TV series Mr. Robot.

=== Political and cyber-activism ===
According to Frédéric Bardeau and Nicolas Danet, Brown and Project PM are 'emblematic' of the trend within hacktivism aimed at organizing and giving coherence to their struggle. This movement, which seeks to overcome the distance and massification inherent to the Internet by channeling it toward specific and clearly defined goals, gave rise to several subsequent hacktivist groups.

== Works ==
=== Books ===
- Brown, Barrett; Alston, Jon P. (2007). Flock of dodos: behind modern creationism, intelligent design & the Easter bunny. New York, NY: Cambridge House Press. ISBN 978-0-9787213-0-5.
- Keep Rootin' for Putin: Establishment Pundits and the Twilight of American Competence. Free Barrett Brown Ltd. 2014.
- My glorious defeats : hacktivist, narcissist, anonymous: a memoir. MCD Farrar, Straus and Giroux. 2024. ISBN 9780374217013.

=== Cinema and Television ===
Brown featured in Relatively Free, a 2016 short documentary by Alex Winter about Brown's drive to a halfway house after he was released from prison. He has also appeared in the 2012 documentary We Are Legion: The Story of the Hacktivists, the 2014 documentary The Hacker Wars, and the 2021 documentary The Face of Anonymous.

== See also ==
- Crowdsourcing
- Freedom of speech
- Hacktivist
- Surveillance state
