= Elizabeth Fink =

American lawyer

Elizabeth Marsha Fink (June 7, 1945 – September 22, 2015) was an American civil rights and criminal defense attorney. She is most prominently associated with lawsuits concerning the Attica Prison riots. A class action suit she filed in 1974, against prison guards for torture and abuse during the riot, was settled in 2000, awarding $12 million to inmates.

== Education ==
Fink was born in Brooklyn to Bernard Fink, a lawyer, and Sylvia Caplan Fink, an anti-nuclear weapon activist and an elder rights activist for the Gray Panthers. She was named after Elizabeth Gurley Flynn, one of the founders of the American Civil Liberties Union. Her older brother, Larry Fink, is a photographer. She graduated from Reed College in 1967 and Brooklyn Law School in 1973.

== Legal work ==
Fink was a founder and senior partner at the Law Office of Elizabeth M. Fink, a civil rights, prisoner rights and criminal defense firm in Brooklyn, New York. The Attica lawsuit consumed much of her time until 2000, when prisoners won a $12 million judgment from the state of New York but received neither an apology nor admission of responsibility from the state.

Fink has also represented other prisoners and political radicals. In 1989, she and others secured acquittals for members of the Ohio 7, political radicals who were charged under a federal seditious conspiracy statute.

Along with attorneys Sarah Kunstler (Kunstler's father, William Kunstler, had long been a mentor of Fink) and Jesse Berman, Fink represented Osama Awadallah, a Palestinian college student studying in the United States, who was arrested as a material witness in the days following the September 11, 2001 attacks and prosecuted for alleged perjury before the grand jury investigating the terrorist attacks. Awadallah was acquitted in November 2006.

Also in 2006, Fink represented Lynne Stewart during sentencing after Stewart's conviction for violating special communication measures involving client Sheik Omar Abdel Rahman. Fink secured a sentence of 28 months, but that was later increased to ten years.

Fink represented Jeremy Hammond, who was convicted in 2013 for the Stratfor email leak.

Fink was a member of a team of attorneys who represented Ahmed Ferhani, who was accused of plotting to blow up synagogues and churches in Manhattan, New York. Fink argued that Ferhani had been entrapped by law enforcement authorities, but Ferhani in 2012 pleaded guilty to terrorism conspiracy and weapons possession charges.

Fink died of a heart attack on September 22, 2015 in New York City, at the age of 70.

== Ghosts of Attica ==
Fink and her paralegal Frank Smith, an inmate leader at the time of the riots, were featured in the 2001 Court TV documentary Ghosts of Attica, which tells the story of the Attica uprising and subsequent lawsuits by Attica inmates. Ghosts received a 2002 Dupont-Columbia University Award for Journalistic Excellence.
