= Michelle Vignes =

French-born American photographer (c. 1926–2012)

- Born: Michelle Marie Vignes c. 1926 – c. 1928; Reims, Grand Est, France
- Died: October 4, 2012; San Francisco, California, U.S.
- Occupations: Photographer, photojournalist, photo editor
- Years active: 1953–2008

Michelle Marie Vignes (c. 1926 – October 4, 2012) was a French-born American photographer and photojournalist. She is known for her documentary photography of social movements in San Francisco starting in the mid-1960s.

== Early life ==
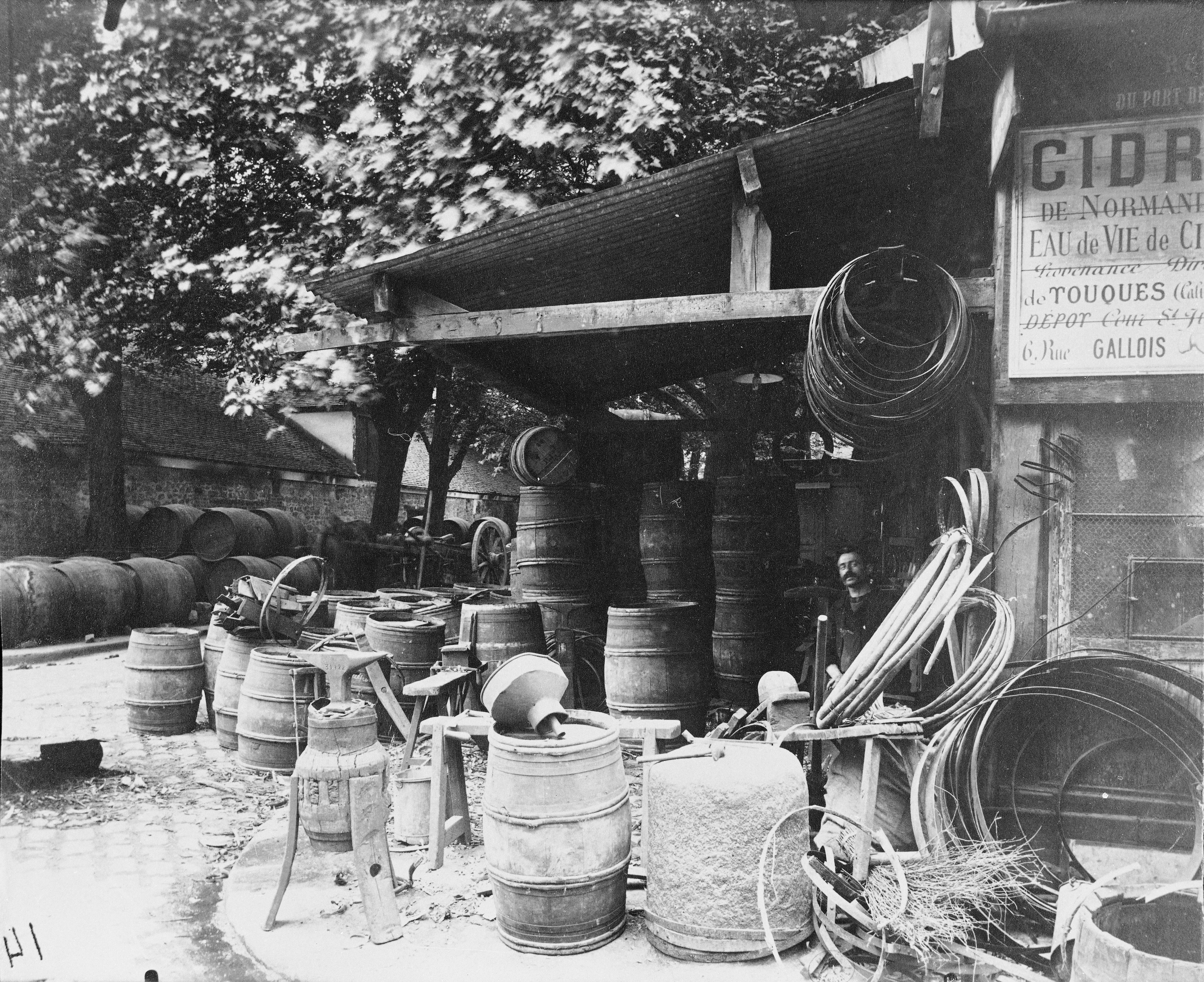
Photo by Michelle Vignes (1970), Rue de l'Abbé Carton Paris 14th

Michelle Vignes was born in Reims in Grand Est, France; the exact date of her birth has discrepancies, and range between 1926 and 1928. During the Nazi occupation she left her home. She did not attend school for photography.

From 1953 until 1957 she worked at Magnum Photos, under photographers Henri Cartier-Bresson and Robert Capa in Paris.

== Career ==
In 1965, Vignes moved to San Francisco, California. Her photos appeared in Time, Life, Vogue, Newsweek, and Ramparts. She had co-founded the International Fund for Photography and Fotovision.

Vignes photo documented the San Francisco's counterculture of the 1960s, draft-card burning protests, the Black Panther Party, the American Indian Movement, the occupation of Alcatraz (1969–1971), the Wounded Knee Occupation (1973), and Oakland's Blues musicians (1980s–1990s).

Examples of Vignes photography can be found in museum collections, including at the Museum of Fine Arts, Houston; the Cantor Arts Center at Stanford University; the Smithsonian American Art Museum in Washington, D.C.; the National Museum of the American Indian in Washington, D.C.; the Centre Pompidou in Paris; and the San Francisco Museum of Modern Art. Her archives are located at the Bancroft Library at the University of California, Berkeley.
