= The Hacker Wars =

- Film poster
- Directed by: Vivien Lesnik Weisman
- Written by: Vivien Lesnik Weisman, Meredith Raithel Perry
- Produced by: Vivien Lesnik Weisman associate producer Joe Fionda
- Cinematography: Joshua Kun
- Edited by: Meredith Raithel Perry
- Music by: Dicepticon; Christopher Lord; Ytcracker
- Release date: October 17, 2014
- Running time: 87 minutes
- Country: United States
- Language: English

The Hacker Wars is a 2014 documentary film about hacktivism in the United States, directed by Vivien Lesnik Weisman. It was released on October 17, 2014 in the US.

Barrett Brown, who appeared in the documentary, was examined as a spokesperson for Anonymous, a label he disputes.

== Synopsis ==
The Hacker Wars tells the story of three young information activists, or hacktivists, and their battles with the US Government. These hacktivists are either terrorists or freedom fighters depending on one's perspective on who should control information.

It is about: “Weev,” infamous hacker and troll; Barrett Brown, journalist and propagandist for the hacktivist collective, Anonymous; and Jeremy Hammond, aka Anarchaos, who, before his arrest, was number one on the FBI's cyber-criminal list. The fourth character is Sabu, the hacker turned FBI informant who ran the FBI's cyber unit for 9 months and is responsible for their arrests. He is the shadowy protagonist in a high-stakes game of espionage and betrayal in the age of the Internet.

In the film, Barrett Brown is facing 105 years in prison for publicizing information revealed through Jeremy Hammond's hacks. Hammond himself had just begun a 10-year prison term.

Andrew Aurenheimer, known by his hacker handle “Weev” embarrasses large corporations. He was sentenced to 41 months for hacking AT&T, but his conviction was overturned. He vows to continue doing what landed him in prison in the first place.

The film is structured so that the viewer is shuttled between story lines quickly, mirroring the disjointed lives of the protagonists and life on the Internet.

Glenn Greenwald (Snowden Leaks), Pulitzer Prize-winning journalist; Thomas Drake, former Senior Executive of the NSA; “the original Edward Snowden”; and others explain why these anti-heroes exposing the security surveillance state through hacking should be supported rather than jailed. They are not merely unveiling surveillance programs and the deep-state intelligence; they are exposing how power works. According to Glenn Greenwald, “What the Anonymous collective and Hammond’s hacks revealed and Barrett Brown publicized is so criminal that it must be exposed no matter what the means. The US Government will go to any lengths, including the suspension of the rule of law, to stop them.”

Barrett Brown, Weev, and Jeremy Hammond have been covered in Rolling Stone, Vice, The Wall Street Journal, The New York Times, The Washington Post, Wired, Gawker, BuzzFeed, and The Nation, and are well known in France and the UK.

== Production ==
The Hacker Wars is the second feature documentary by Vivien Lesnik Weisman.
