= Larry Fink (photographer) =

American photographer (1941–2023)

- Born: Laurence Bruce Fink; March 11, 1941; New York City, U.S.
- Died: November 25, 2023 (aged 82); Martins Creek, Pennsylvania, U.S.
- Education: The New School for Social Research
- Occupation: Photographer
- Spouses: Joan Snyder (m. 1969; div. 1985); Pia Staniek (divorced); Martha Posner (m. 2000)
- Children: 1
- Relatives: Elizabeth Fink (sister)

Laurence Bruce Fink (March 11, 1941 – November 25, 2023) was an American photographer and educator, best known for his black-and-white images of people at parties and in other social situations.

== Early life and education ==
Laurence Bruce Fink was born to a Jewish family in Brooklyn, New York, on March 11, 1941. The family moved to West Hempstead, New York when Fink was thirteen. His father, Bernard Fink, was a lawyer, and his mother, Sylvia Caplan Fink, was an anti-nuclear weapons activist and an elder rights activist for the Gray Panthers. He grew up in a politically conscious household and described himself as "a Marxist from Long Island." His younger sister Elizabeth Fink (1945–2015) was a lawyer.

Fink studied at the New School for Social Research in New York City, where photographer Lisette Model was one of his teachers and encouraged his work.

== Works ==
Fink's best-known work is Social Graces, a series of photographs he produced in the 1970s that depicted and contrasted wealthy Manhattanites at fashionable clubs and social events alongside working-class people from rural Pennsylvania participating in events such as high school graduations. Social Graces was the subject of a solo exhibition at the Museum of Modern Art in 1979 and was published in book form in 1984. A New York Times reviewer described the series as exploring social class by comparing "two radically divergent worlds", while accomplishing "one of the things that straight photography does best: provid[ing] excruciatingly intimate glimpses of real people and their all-too-fallibly-human lives."

In 2001, for an assignment from The New York Times Magazine, Fink created a series of satirical color images of President George W. Bush and his cabinet (portrayed by stand-ins) in scenes of decadent revelry modeled on paintings by Weimar-era painters Max Beckmann, Otto Dix, and George Grosz. The planned publication of the series was canceled after the September 11 attacks, but was displayed in the summer of 2004 at the PowerHouse Gallery in New York City, in a show titled The Forbidden Pictures: A Political Tableau.

== Teaching career ==
Fink taught at Bard College from 1988 to 2017. He had previously taught at other institutions including the Yale University School of Art (1977–1978), Cooper Union School of Art and Architecture (1978–1983), Parsons School of Design, and New York University.

== Personal life and family ==
In 1969 Fink married artist Joan Snyder. Around this time, they moved from New York to Martins Creek, Pennsylvania. They had a daughter, Molly Snyder-Fink, and divorced in 1985. He was later married to Pia Staniek, with this marriage also ending in divorce. In 2000, he married Martha Posner.

Fink died from complications of kidney disease and Alzheimer's disease at his home on November 25, 2023, at the age of 82.

== Awards and honors ==
- 1976: Guggenheim Fellowship from the John Simon Guggenheim Memorial Foundation
- 1979: Guggenheim Fellowship from the John Simon Guggenheim Memorial Foundation
- 1978: National Endowment for the Arts Individual Photography Fellowship
- 1986: National Endowment for the Arts Individual Photography Fellowship
- 2002: Honorary doctorate from the College for Creative Studies in Detroit
- 2015: Infinity Award in art, International Center of Photography, New York

== Publications ==
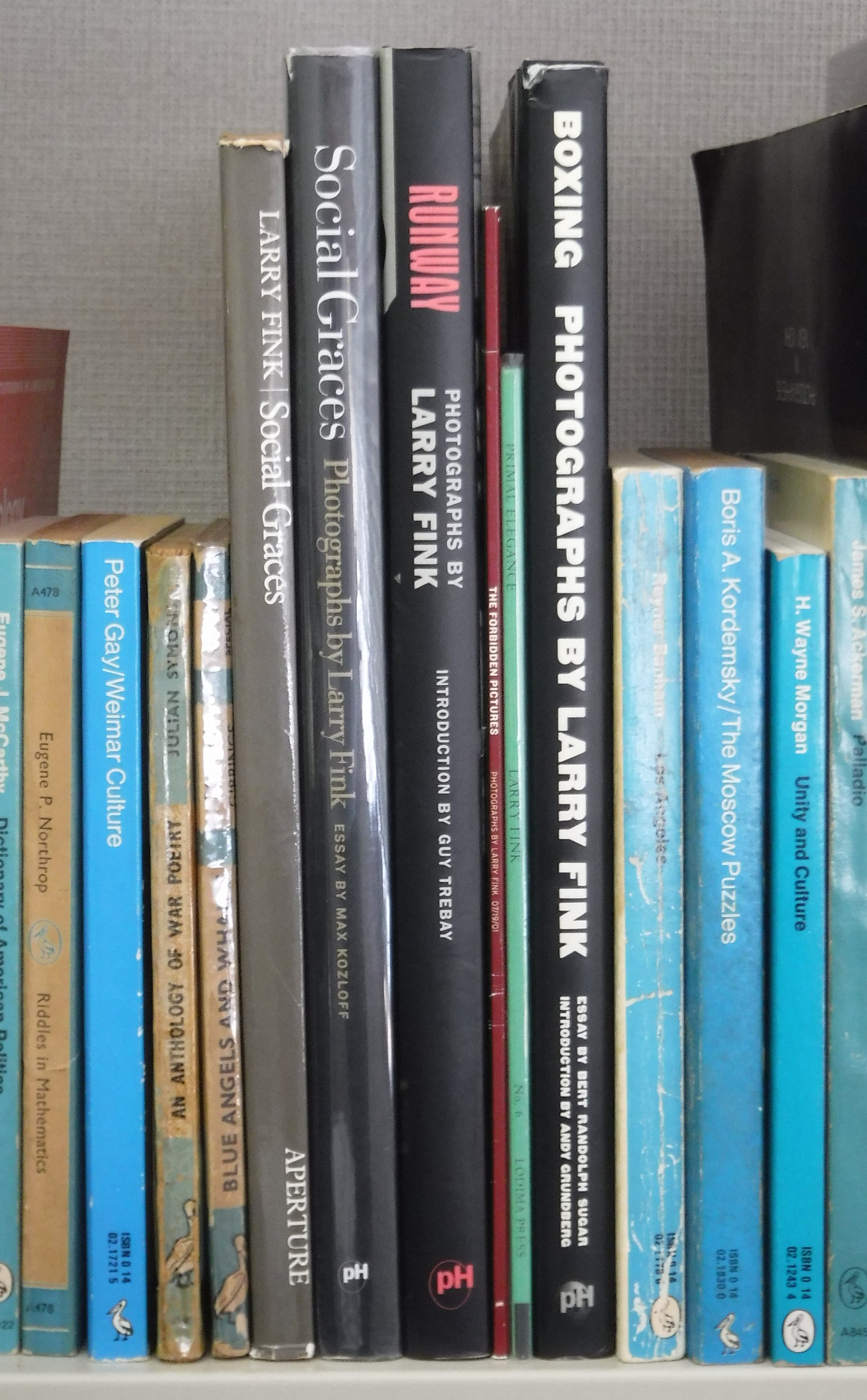
Six books by Larry Fink (flanked by irrelevant Pelicans); from left to right: Social Graces (1984), Social Graces (1999), Runway, The Forbidden Pictures, Primal Elegance, Boxing

- Photographs. San Francisco: San Francisco Museum of Modern Art, 1981. Booklet accompanying an exhibition by Fink and Joel Sternfeld.
- Ist Fotografie Kunst? Gehört Fotografie ins Museum? "Internationales Fotosymposion 1981, Schloss Mickeln bei Düsseldorf." Munich: Mahnert-Lueg, 1982. ISBN 3922170250. Contribution by Fink.
- Social Graces. Millerton, New York: Aperture, 1984. ISBN 0-89381-135-1 (clothbound); ISBN 0-89381-159-9 (collectors' edition); ISBN 0-89381-201-3 (softcover).
  - Social Graces. New York: PowerHouse, 1999. ISBN 1-57687-048-0 (regular edition); ISBN 1-57687-049-9 (limited edition). Larger format and redesigned, with an introductory text (first published in 1979) by Max Kozloff.
- Focus Santa Barbara. Santa Barbara, CA: Santa Barbara Contemporary Arts Forum, 1985. Catalogue for an exhibition, September–October 1985, by Fink, Walter Cotton, Lee Friedlander, Mary Ellen Mark, Richard Misrach, and Richard Ross.
- Pleasures and Terrors of Domestic Comfort. New York: The Museum of Modern Art, 1991. Edited by Peter Galassi, contribution by Fink.
- Still Working: Underknown Artists of Age in America. [New York]: Parsons School of Design, New York, 1994. ISBN 0295973854. Edited by Stewart Shedletsky; photographs by Fink; essays by Ann Gibson.
- Waking the Wood: Martha Posner: January 19 through March 2, 1995. Allentown, PA: Frank Martin Gallery, Baker Center for the Arts, Muhlenberg College, [1995]. OCLC 630168745 Booklet with an introduction and photographs by Larry Fink, essay by J.M. Welker.
- Uma cidade assim. Matosinhos: Câmara Municipal de Matosinhos, 1996. ISBN 9729143234. Photographs by Fink and Bruno Sequeira. (Note: A companion volume (ISBN 9729143242) has photographs by Gabriele Basilico and Augusto Alves da Silva.)
- Boxing. New York: PowerHouse, 1997. ISBN 1-57687-008-1 (regular edition); ISBN 1-57687-009-X (limited edition). By Fink. Introduction by Andy Grundberg; essay by Bert Randolph Sugar.
- Fish and Wine: Larry Fink's Photographs of Portugal. Easton, PA: Lafayette College, Art Gallery, Williams Center for the Arts, 1997. ISBN 0966032209. Booklet to accompany an exhibition held in September 1997 at Lafayette College, Easton, Pennsylvania, and October–November 1997 at Gateway Center IV, Newark, New Jersey. With an essay by George E. Panichas.
- Rent. New York: William Morrow, 1997. ISBN 0688154379. About the musical Rent; by Jonathan Larson et al.; photography by Fink and Stewart Ferebee.
- Ellis Island: Echoes from a Nation's Past. New York: Aperture, 1997. ISBN 0893813974. With photographs by Fink and others.
- Runway. New York: PowerHouse, 1999. ISBN 1-57687-027-8 (regular edition); ISBN 157687-028-6 (limited edition). By Fink, with an introduction by Guy Trebay.
- A City Seen: Photographs from the George Gund Foundation Collection. Cleveland: The Cleveland Museum of Art, 2002. ISBN 0940717689. Contribution by Fink.
- The Forbidden Pictures: Photographs. New York: PowerHouse, 2004. ISBN 1-57687-244-0. Twelve photographs by Fink, with texts by Fink and others.
- Woolrich Roadtrip 2004, New York, NY to Woolrich, PA. Woolrich, PA: Woolrich, 2004.
- Larry Fink. Phaidon 55. London: Phaidon, 2005. ISBN 071484022X. By Laurie Dahlberg.
- Primal Elegance. Portfolio Book Series, no. 6. Revere, PA: Lodima, 2005. ISBN 1-888899-29-8. Edition of 1000. Fourteen photographs by Fink of mantises.
- Somewhere There's Music. Bologna: Damiani, 2006. ISBN 8889431563; ISBN 8889431628. By Fink, with an essay by George E. Panichas.
- Cleveland Clinic: Two Views. Cleveland: Cleveland Clinic, 2006. ISBN 0979082706. Photographs by Fink and Andrew Moore.
- Effetto Luce. Florence: Luce della Vite, 2007. The publisher's description: "In 2007 Luce della Vite, the Montalcino wine producer hosted an gala event with international media and guests, including celebrities from the worlds of entertainment, fashion, wine and business, arrive in Florence to celebrate launch of new Luce wine at the prestigious Villa i Collazzi in Florence on Saturday night and photographer Larry Fink captured the most significant moments of the Effetto Luce evening."
- Night at the Met. N.p. Fotovision, 2009. Photographs by Fink of the Metropolitan Museum of Art.
- The Vanities: Hollywood Parties 2000–2009: Photographs. Munich: Schirmer/Mosel, 2011. ISBN 3829605269. By Fink, with essays by Lucy Sante and Ash Carter, text in English and German.
- Larry Fink: Attraction and Desire: 50 Years in Photography. Saint Louis, MO: The Sheldon Art Galleries, [2011]. ISBN 0578077388. Accompanying an exhibition at the Sheldon Art Galleries, February–May 2011. With an essay by Olivia Lahs-Gonzales.
- Contatti. Provini d'Autore = Choosing the best photo by using the contact sheet. Vol. I. Edited by Giammaria De Gasperis. Rome: Postcart, 2012. ISBN 978-88-86795-87-6. Contribution by Fink.
- Larry Fink on Composition and Improvisation. New York: Aperture, 2014. ISBN 1597112739. With an introduction by Lisa Kereszi.
- The Beats. Brooklyn, NY: PowerHouse, 2014. ISBN 1576876896. Photographs by Fink of the beats, with an essay and poem by Gerald Stern and an essay by Robert Cordier.
- Kindred Spirits. Minor Matters, 2014. By Fink, with an essay by Peter Barberie.
- Opening the Sky. London: Stanley Barker, 2015. ISBN 9780956992239.
