= Yo Soy 132 =

Mexican protest movement

- Part of the 2012 Mexican general election, Impact of the Arab Spring
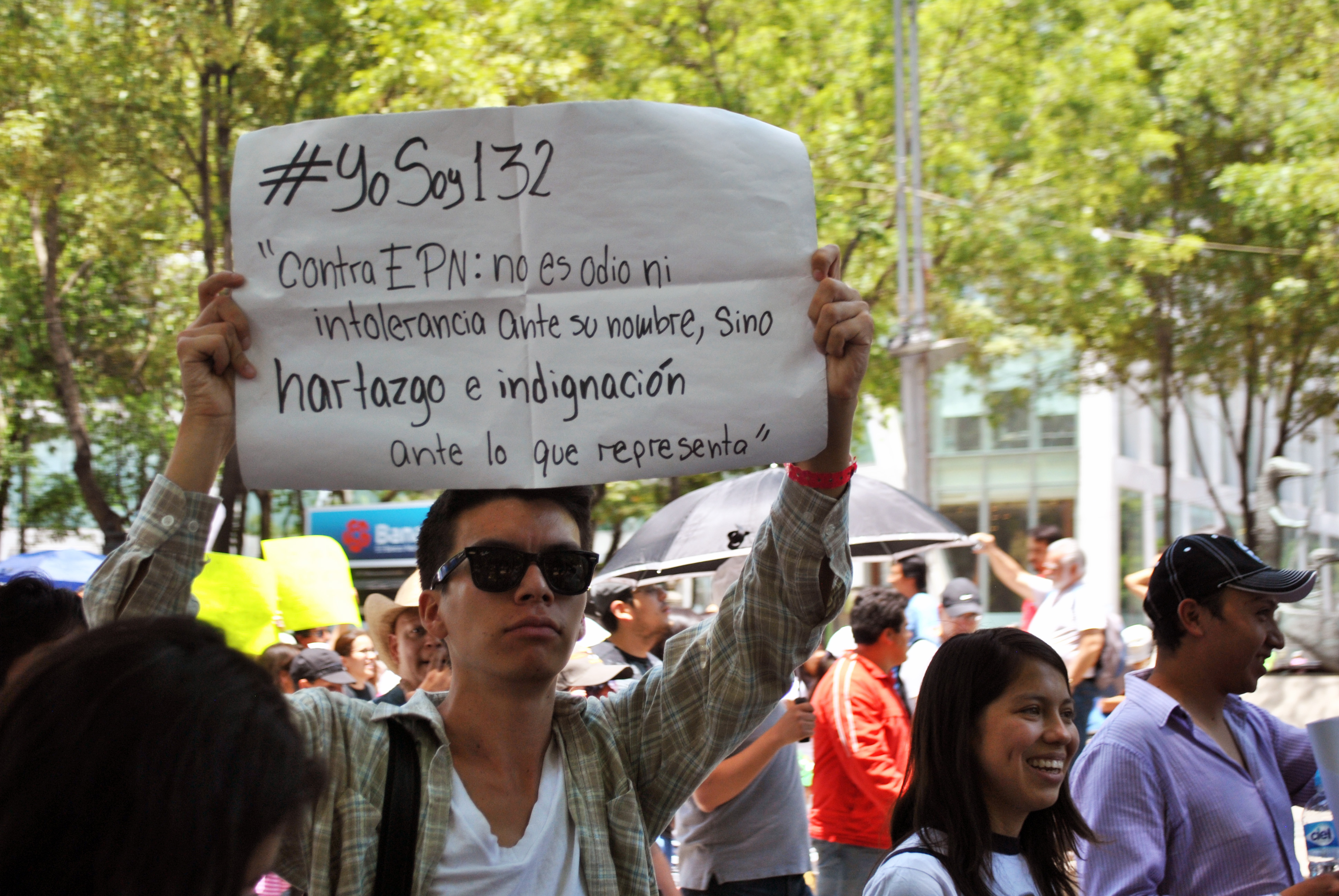
- Poster stating #YoSoy132 against EPN: it's not hate nor intolerance against his name, but rather being full of indignation as to what he represents
- Date: 15 May 2012 –2013
- Location: Mexico
- Caused by: Media bias; Political corruption; Electoral fraud
- Goals: Improved coverage of elections; Public broadcast of presidential debate; Democratization; Profound political change
- Methods: Online activism; Demonstrations
- Result: National broadcast of second presidential debate; Hosting a third debate among the three losing candidates in the Mexican presidential election

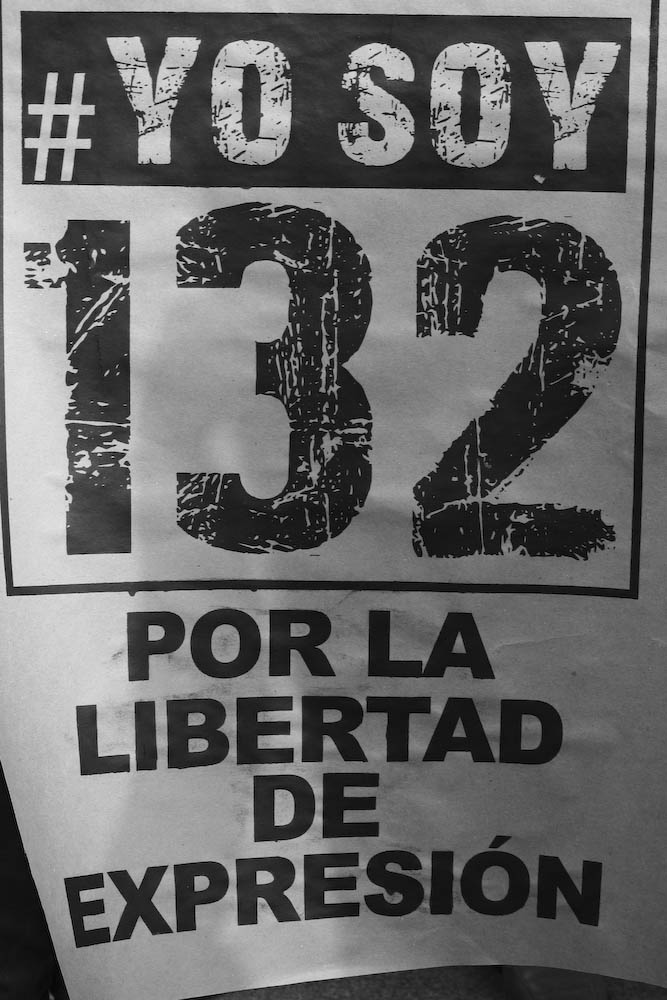
#YoSoy 132 For freedom of expression

Yo Soy 132, commonly stylized as #YoSoy132, was a protest movement composed of Mexican university students from both private and public universities, residents of Mexico, claiming supporters from about 50 cities around the world. It began as opposition to the Institutional Revolutionary Party (PRI) candidate Enrique Peña Nieto and the Mexican media's allegedly biased coverage of the 2012 general election. The name Yo Soy 132, Spanish for "I Am 132", originated in an expression of solidarity with the original 131 protest's initiators. The phrase drew inspiration from the Occupy movement and the Spanish 15-M movement. The protest movement was known worldwide as the "Mexican spring" (an allusion to the Arab Spring) after claims made by its first spokespersons, and called the "Mexican occupy movement" in the international press.

== Origins ==
On May 11, 2012, then Institutional Revolutionary Party Mexican Presidential Candidate Enrique Peña Nieto visited the Ibero-American University to present his political platform to the students as part of the Buen Ciudadano Ibero (good Ibero citizen) forum. At the end of his discussion, he was asked by a group of students a question regarding the 2006 civil unrest in San Salvador Atenco, in which then-governor of the State of Mexico Peña Nieto called in state police to break up a protest by local residents, which led to several protestors being violently beaten, raped, and others killed (including a child). Peña responded that it was a decisive action that he personally enacted, to re-establish order and peace within the legitimate rights of the State of Mexico to use public force, and that it was found valid by the National Supreme Court. His response was met with applause by his supporters and slogans against his campaign from students who disliked his statement.

Video of the event was recorded by various students and uploaded onto social media, but major Mexican television channels and national newspapers reported that the protest was not by students of the university. This angered many of the Ibero-American University students, prompting 131 of them to publish a video on YouTube identifying themselves by their University ID card. The video went viral, and protests spread across various campuses. People showed their support of the 131 students' message by stating, mainly on Twitter, that they were the 132nd student—"I am 132"— thus giving birth to the Yo Soy 132 movement.

== Protests ==
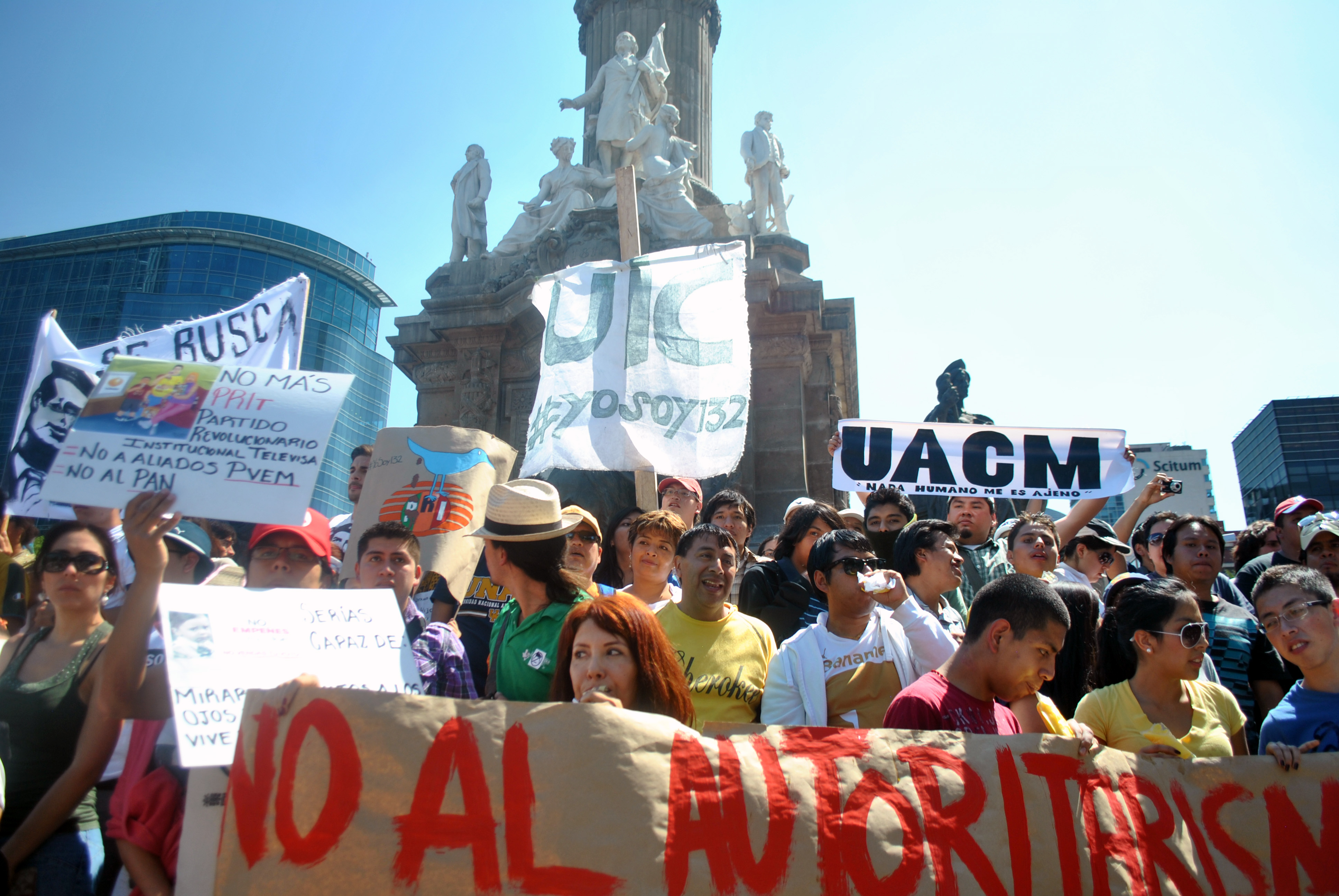
Yo Soy 132 protest in Mexico City at the Monumento a la Independencia

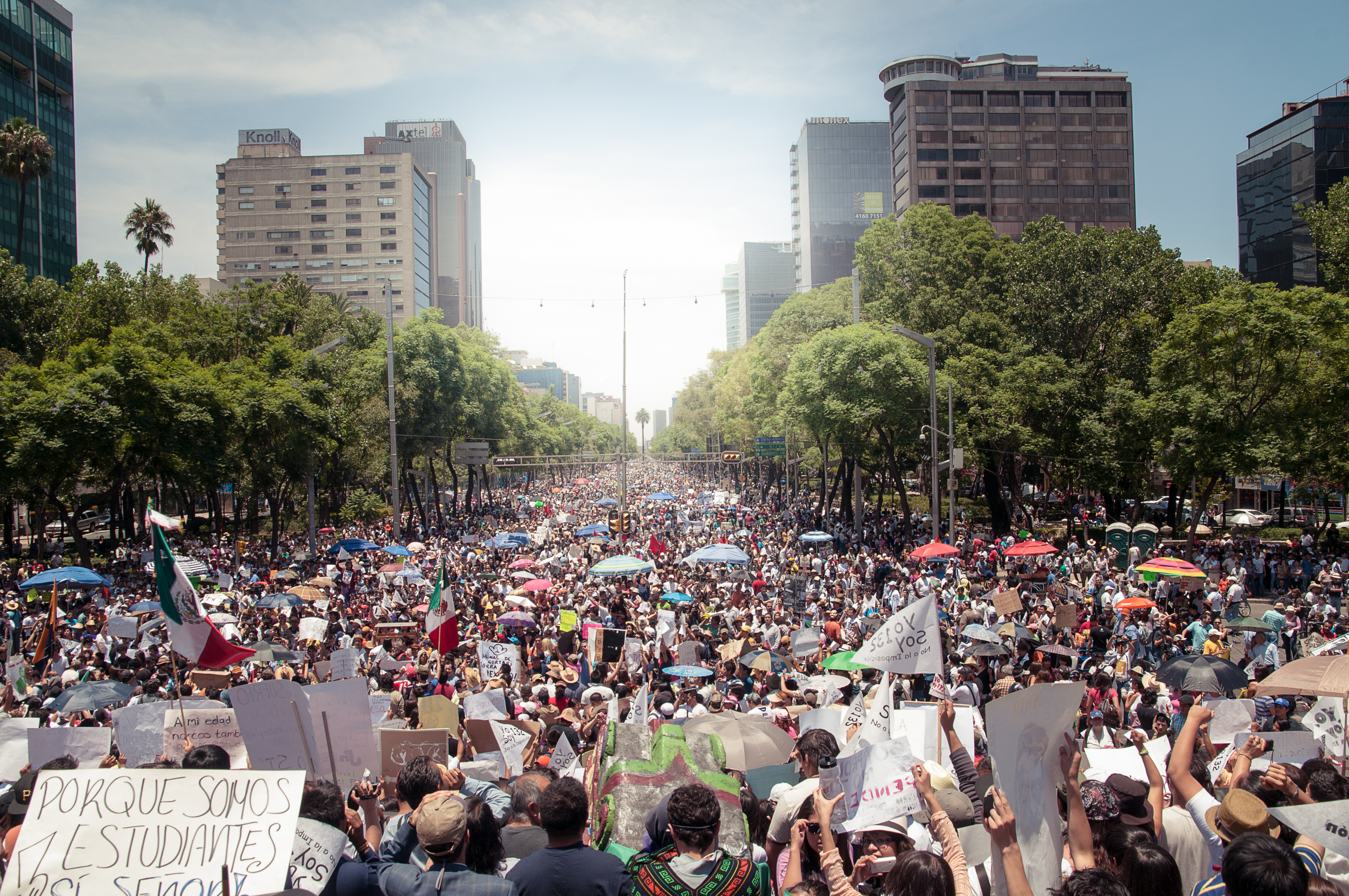
Yo Soy 132 protest in Mexico City on May 19, 2012

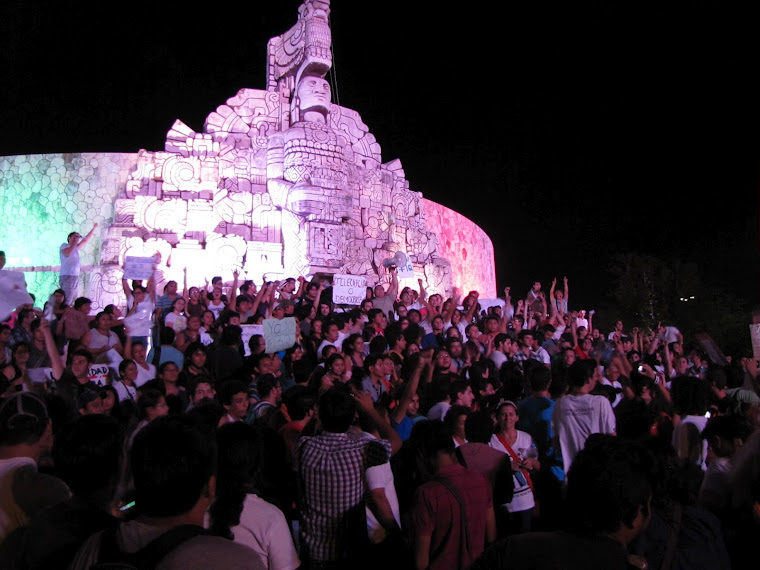
Yucatán

Protest in Monumento a la Patria; Mérida, Yucatán

Since the beginning of the movement, protest tactics included silent marches, concerts, encouraging political participation in elections, and marching without being on the street and disrupting traffic. Rallies and marches happened in the capital, Mexico City, and also in 12 of the 32 states of the Mexican Republic.

Outside of Mexico, various individuals, mostly Mexican students benefited by government grants for studying abroad, created their own messages of solidarity from the country they were studying.

The success of the movement in unifying thousands of students prompted political analysts to consider whether the movement would cause trouble for the next government in the election results. This was not to be the case, although the fairness of the elections was criticized.

== Goals ==
On June 5, 2012, students gathered at the National Autonomous University of Mexico (UNAM), the country's largest public university, and agreed that the movement should aspire to go beyond the general election and become a national force.

=== General principles ===
On August 10, 2012, YoSoy132 International group published a translation of the General Principles.

The movement claimed as a success of their demands that the second Mexican presidential debate was broadcast nationwide; however, the broadcast was done by Televisa and TV Azteca, both companies previously labeled by the movement as unreliable and untrustable sources of information. It also proposed a third debate organized by members of the Yo Soy 132 movement that was held without the presence of Enrique Peña Nieto, who rejected the invitation and said it lacked conditions of impartiality. This third debate was accessible only to the privileged society with access to broadband internet, something that wasn't common in 2012 in Mexico, which led to criticism.

== Public opinion ==
=== Support ===
Yo Soy 132 was compared by their first spokespersons to the Arab Spring movement that occurred in the Arab world, as well as the Occupy movement.

This is because all three movements rely on grassroots support and have used social media as a way to communicate and organize, as well as using civil resistance.

The Occupy Wall Street movement acknowledged these similarities by writing a post on their website expressing their solidarity with Yo Soy 132.

The movement also promotes a leaderless structure, in which no one person is the leader, as well as having multiple demands.

=== Opposition ===
On June 11, 2012, four persons who named themselves generación mx, through a YouTube video claimed they were allegedly part of Yo Soy 132 and announced their supposed departure, claiming that they perceived that the movement favored the leftist candidate Andrés Manuel López Obrador. They claimed to have the same goals as the Yo Soy 132 movement of democratization of the media, political reform, environmental protection, and calling politicians' attention to the agenda of Mexican youth.

It was later uncovered by social network activists that the generacion mx members were directly linked to Peña Nieto's political party, the PRI, the one Yo Soy 132 was campaigning against.

A spokesperson of GenerationMX denied ties with the PRI party and his current employer COPARMEX.

The movement has also been opposed on social media by so-called Peñabots – automated accounts used for propaganda purposes.

== See also ==
- National Regeneration Movement
- 2012 Mexican elections protests
- 1DMX riots
- Peña's birthday present
- SEDENAs website deface
- Mexican Indignados Movement
- List of protests in the 21st century
