= HackThisSite =

Organization

HackThisSite.org
- HackThisSite
- Formation: 2003
- Purpose: Hacking/media
- Location(s): United States; International
- Origin: Chicago, Illinois
- Founders: xec96 The_Anarchist spiffomatic64 randomcola
- Products: HackThisZine e-zine
- Affiliations: Hackbloc
- Website: www.hackthissite.org

HackThisSite.org (HTS) is an online hacking and security website founded by Jeremy Hammond. The site is maintained by members of the community after he left the organization. It aims to provide users with a way to learn and practice basic and advanced "hacking" skills through a series of challenges in a safe and legal environment. The organization has a user base of over a million, though the number of active members is believed to be much lower. The most users online at the same time was 19,950 on February 5, 2018 at 2:46 a.m. CT.

HackThisSite involves a small, loose team of developers and moderators who maintain its website, IRC server, and related projects. It produces an e-zine which it releases at various hacker conventions and through its hackbloc portal. Hard copies of the magazine are published by Microcosm and Quimbys. It also has a short news/blog section run by developers.

== IRC and forums ==
HackThisSite is known for its IRC network, where many users converse on a plethora of topics ranging from current events to technical issues with programming and Unix-based operating systems. Mostly, the HackThisSite IRC network serves as a social gathering of like-minded people to discuss anything. Although there are many channels on the IRC network, the main channel, #hackthissite, has a +R flag which requires users to register their nick (username) before they may join the channel. This requirement helps reduce botnets in the main channel, because they would have to register every nick.

Following the split from its former sister site CriticalSecurity.Net, HackThisSite retained one main set of forums. The Hackbloc forums also had many HackThisSite users involved, but they were taken down. Before the split, the CriticalSecurity.net forums had most HTS discussion, specifically related to help with the challenges on the site as well as basic hacking questions. The Hackbloc forums were more for focused hacktivist discussion as well as a place for people to discuss news and plan future projects. Many people criticize the forums as being too beginner-focused compared to IRC, most likely because many new users visit the forums to ask for help with the challenges. HackThisSite is taking steps to try to attract more qualified users to its forums. Members contribute original texts to the articles area of the site. This area is broken down into different sections on a range of topics. Some of these sections include Ethics, HTS Challenge Tutorials, and Political Activism. The topics covered in these articles range widely in complexity. Topics range from walkthroughs for the missions provided by HackThisSite, to articles regarding advanced techniques in a plethora of programming languages.

== Mission challenges ==
HackThisSite is also host to a series of "missions" aimed at simulating real world hacks. These range from ten basic missions where one attempts to exploit relatively simple server-side scripting errors, to difficult programming and application cracking missions. The missions work on a system of points where users are awarded scores based on their completion of missions. In general, the missions become steadily more difficult as the user advances through a particular mission category.

=== Basic and realistic challenges ===
The Web hacking challenges includes eleven Basic Web Challenges. Each challenge consists of an authentication page with a password entry box, plus other files which are to be exploited or attacked in order to gain the correct password. Successful authentication to the main challenge page will advance the user to the next challenge. These challenges are typically considered simple and are used as an introduction to hacking. There are sixteen Realistic Missions which attempt to mimic real, moderate to difficult hacking, in real life situations. Each mission is a complete web site featuring multiple pages and scripts. Users must successfully exploit one or more of the web sites pages to gain access to required data or to produce changes.

=== Programming missions ===
A Programming Challenges section also exists. This section currently consists of twelve challenges charging the user to write a program which will perform a specified function within a certain number of seconds after activation. These programming challenges range from simple missions such as parsing the contents, to reverse-engineering an encryption algorithm. These help users develop and practice on-the-go programming skills.

=== Application missions ===
The goal of application challenges is generally to extract a key from an application, which usually involves some form of reverse-engineering. Other challenges involve program manipulation.

=== New missions ===
More recently, HTS came out with logic challenges, which moo, HTS's official bot, proclaimed were "not meant as a challenge to overcome like the rest of HTS challenges." Instead, the logic challenges were meant to be overcome by the participant alone from solving. In April 2009, they were disabled and all points earned from logic challenges were removed. Reasons included concern that the answers could have been easily found elsewhere on the internet.

Likewise, the "extended basic" missions are of recent creation. These are designed to be code review missions where partakers learn how to read code and search for flaws.

A set of 10 easter eggs hidden around HTS were known as the "HTS missions." For example, one of these "missions" was the fake Admin Panel. Developers later decided to remove HTS easter eggs, as some allowed XSS and SQL exploits and many members submitted false bug reports as a result.

=== Steganography missions ===
Steganography missions are also available on the website. The goal in these missions is to extract the hidden message from the media file provided. There are 17 steganography missions available.

== Controversy ==
There has been criticism that HackThisSite's self-description as a "hacker training ground" encourages people to break the law. Many people related to the site state that although some of the skills taught can be used for illegal activities, HackThisSite does not participate in or support such activities. Despite this, several individual members have been arrested and convicted for illegal activity (most notably Jeremy Hammond, founder of HackThisSite).

=== phpBB/HowDark incident ===
In November 2004 the (now defunct) HackThisSite-based HowDark Security Group notified the phpBB Group, makers of the phpBB bulletin software, of a serious vulnerability in the product. The vulnerability was kept under wraps while it was brought to the attention of the phpBB admins, who after reviewing, proceeded to downplay its risks. Unhappy with the Groups' failure to take action, HowDark then published the bug on the bugtraq mailing-list. Malicious users found and exploited the vulnerability which led to the takedown of several phpBB-based bulletin boards and websites. Only then did the admins take notice and release a fix. Slowness to patch the vulnerability by end-users led to an implementation of the exploit in the Perl/Santy worm (read full article) which defaced upwards of 40,000 websites and bulletin boards within a few hours of its release.

=== Protest Warrior incident ===
On March 17, 2005, Jeremy Hammond, the founder of HackThisSite, was arrested following an FBI investigation into an alleged hacking of conservative political activist group Protest Warrior. His apartment was raided by the Chicago FBI, and all electronic equipment was seized. The federal government claimed that a select group of HackThisSite hackers gained access to the Protest Warrior user database, procured user credit-card information and conspired to run scripts that would automatically wire money to a slew of non-profit organizations. The plot was uncovered when a hacker said to have been disgruntled with the progress of the activities turned informant.

=== Internal problems ===
Administrators, developers, and moderators on HackThisSite are arranged in a democratic but highly anarchical fashion. This structure appears to work at most times. When disputes arise, however, loyalties tend to become very confusing. Therefore, HackThisSite has had a long history of administrators, developers, and moderators turning darkside or severely impairing or completely taking down the site. In the last major attack to occur, several blackhat dissidents gained root-level access to the website and proceeded to "rm -rf" the entire site. Subsequently, HTS was down for months as a result.

== See also ==
- Hacker (computer security)
- Hacktivism
