= Fotovision =

- Formation: 2003
- Founded at: San Francisco Bay Area
- Type: non profit
- Purpose: support photographers in creating, editing, funding and distributing a body of work

Fotovision was a non-profit organization based in the San Francisco Bay Area. It was founded in 2003 by a group of photojournalists, media professionals and educators from US photojournalism programs. The organization's 1,000+ members were amateur photographers as well as professionals. Fotovision ceased operation in 2011. Melanie Light was executive director and steered the organization from its inception creating workshops, public events and publications.

== Mission ==
The primary mission of Fotovision was to support photographers in creating, editing, funding and distributing a body of work. To accomplish this, it worked with an international network of photographers, editors, printers, publishers and arts administrators to offer workshops for photographers of all skill levels. As of 2011 Fotovision and its assets were donated to UC Berkeley where the University continues an annual artist talk, the Fotovision Lecture Series, in its name.

== Workshops ==
Fotovision provided a range of one day, weekend immersion and 5-week courses. Classes were offered in digital documentary, studio lighting, book publication, multimedia for documentary photographers, long-term documentary project and marketing. Workshop leaders included Sebastião Salgado, Antonin Kratochvil, James Nachtwey, Gene Richards, Ken Light, Joel Meyerowitz, Kim Komenich, Alan Rapp, Alex Webb and Rebecca Norris Webb.

== Events and exhibitions ==
In collaboration with the Berkeley School of Journalism, Fotovision hosted lectures by photographers, film screenings and book signings. In addition, Fotovision exhibited members' work in exhibitions such as Aperture PhotoSF. The largest event held was with Sebatião Salgado in San Francisco where over 1,000 people attended a paid conversation and showing of Salgado's Genesis exhibition. Under Melanie Light's direction, Fotovision published books by Larry Fink and Stephen Goldblatt's Beatles project, with editions sold as fundraisers for the non-profit.
