= Stratfor email leak =

Data breach of Global Intelligence Files

Logo of Stratfor

WikiLeaks began publishing emails leaked from strategic intelligence company Stratfor on 27 February 2012 under the title Global Intelligence Files. By July 2014, WikiLeaks had published 5,543,061 Stratfor emails. Wikileaks partnered with more than 25 world media organisations, including Rolling Stone, L’Espresso and The Hindu to analyse the documents.

Stratfor is an Austin, Texas-based security group, which includes government agencies and some of the world's biggest companies as its clients. On December 24, 2011, hackers took control of Stratfor's website and released a list of names, credit card numbers, passwords, and home and email addresses. Those listed were affiliated with organizations such as Bank of America, the United States Department of Defense, Médecins Sans Frontières, Lockheed Martin, Los Alamos National Laboratory, and the United Nations. The hackers included Jeremy Hammond, who worked with Anonymous to release Stratfor's emails to WikiLeaks. The emails revealed Stratfor's surveillance of groups such as Occupy Wall Street and activists fighting for compensation from Dow Chemicals for the Bhopal disaster.

The e-mails are alleged to include client information, notes between Stratfor employees and internal procedural documentation on securing intelligence data. The communications date from July 2004 through to December 2011. Stratfor said the emails appeared to be those that were stolen by hackers in December 2011. In an initial announcement, WikiLeaks stated that they opened up a database of the emails to two dozen media organizations operating in several countries, including the McClatchy Company, l'Espresso, la Repubblica, ARD, the Russia Reporter, and Rolling Stone, along with a "sneak preview" to the Yes Men.

In June 2012, Stratfor settled a class action lawsuit regarding the hack.

== Content ==
Stratfor stated that some of the leaked emails "may be forged or altered to include inaccuracies; some may be authentic", pointing to a phony email saying that Stratfor's CEO George Friedman had resigned. They stated that the emails represented candid internal language that would probably be ripe for misinterpretation. Outlets reported that the Stratfor emails had malware in downloads and on the WikiLeaks website.

One of the first items released was an email containing a glossary titled "The Stratfor Glossary of Useful, Baffling and Strange Intelligence Terms", which contained concise and sometimes humorously candid definitions, along with pointed assessments of U.S. intelligence and law enforcement. The glossary included items on how "background checks" can help "run up clients’ bill and makes it appear that you are busy" and how "briefs" for customers need to "make sh*t smell good".

=== Julian Assange ===
Wikileaks said "the material contains privileged information about the U.S. government’s attacks against Julian Assange and WikiLeaks and Stratfor’s own attempts to subvert WikiLeaks. There are more than 4,000 e-mails mentioning WikiLeaks or Julian Assange". Emails from Fred Burton, who was Stratfor's Vice-President for Counterterrorism and Corporate Security and former Deputy Chief of the counterterrorism division of the Diplomatic Security Service, indicated that he knew in January 2011 about a United States Government secret indictment against Assange. Internal Stratfor emails gave a suggested strategy for dealing with Assange: "Pile on. Move him from country to country to face various charges for the next 25 years". Burton wrote that his strategy would be "Bankrupt the arsehole first, ruin his life. Give him 7-12 yrs for conspiracy". In one published email Burton allegedly wrote "Assange is going to make a nice bride in prison. Screw the terrorist. He'll be eating cat food forever." In another leaked email, a Stratfor employee wanted Assange waterboarded.

=== Governmental ===
The emails show Stratfor had contracts with Department of Homeland Security, the Defense Intelligence Agency and the Marine Corps. Mark LeVine, professor of history at the University of California, Irvine, described this as "troubling" because Homeland Security had coordinated police attacks on the Occupy movement.

An email from a Stratfor analyst indicated that up to 12 officials in Pakistan's Inter-Services Intelligence (ISI) agency knew of Osama bin-Laden's safe house.

Ynetnews reported that, according to internal emails between Stratfor employees, Israel and Russia were engaged in an exchange of information in 2008. Israel gave Russia "data link codes" for unmanned aerial vehicles (Elbit Hermes 450) that Israel sold to Georgia and in return Russia gave Israel "the codes for Tor-M1 missile defense systems that Russia sold Iran". Ynetnews also stated that, during the 2008 South Ossetia war, the leaked emails revealed Georgia "realized that their UAVs were compromised and were looking for a replacement for the Israeli made drones".

Business Insider reported that Israeli Prime Minister Benjamin Netanyahu was an intelligence source for Stratfor between 2007 and 2010. In emails, Fred Burton discussed his personal communications with Netanyahu. Burton stated by email that Netanyahu informed him of his success in consolidating power within the Likud party ahead of regaining the position of prime minister, shared thoughts regarding his distrust of US President Barack Obama, threatened assassination of Hezbollah leader Hassan Nasrallah, and declared intentions to unilaterally start a war against Iran.

Al Akhbar, citing internal emails from the Stratfor hack, reported former Blackwater director James F. Smith had a relationship with Stratfor and was for a time considered one of their major sources.

The emails indicate that Stratfor was receiving information about Venezuelan president Hugo Chavez's medical condition from an Israeli intelligence source.

In the emails, staff discuss a report from a Stratfor source that Israeli commandos and Kurdish fighters destroyed Iranian nuclear facilities.

=== Companies ===
Multinational corporations use Statfor to obtain intelligence on their critics. Dow Chemical, Lockheed Martin, Northrop Grumman, Raytheon and Coca-Cola have used Stratfor's services.

The Times of India reported that some emails indicate Stratfor was hired by Dow Chemical to spy on activists seeking compensation from Dow for the Bhopal disaster. Dow Chemical Company responded with a written statement that read: "Major companies are often required to take appropriate action to protect their people and safeguard their facilities," and that it had not broken any laws.

The released emails indicated that Coca-Cola paid Stratfor to determine "to what extent will US-based PETA supporters travel to Canada to support activism" at the 2010 Olympics. The Coca-Cola Company responded to the emails with a statement saying that they "consider it prudent to monitor for protest activities at any major event we sponsor". Stratfor offered its services to Bank of America to investigate journalist Glenn Greenwald.

=== Other ===
Stratfor received information from an informant at Occupy Austin, who was working as an undercover operative for the Texas Department of Public Safety.

A memo from Friedman to his staff stated that Stratfor was partnering with Shea Morenz from Goldman Sachs, to create its own hedge fund. The memo said that the fund "would allow us to utilize the intelligence we were gathering about the world in a new but related venue—an investment fund. Where we had previously advised other hedge funds, we would now have our own, itself fully funded by Shea. Shea invested over $2 million in Stratfor".

== Responses ==
=== Stratfor ===
Around midnight on February 27, Stratfor released a statement saying that "the release of its stolen emails was an attempt to silence and intimidate it." It also dismissed rumors of CEO and founder George Friedman's resignation.

=== Others ===
WikiLeaks founder Julian Assange told Reuters that his concerns with Stratfor stem from it relying on informants from government agencies and its monitoring of activist organizations. He also accused Stratfor of making investments based on the intelligence it obtained. After the release was announced, analysts questioned the value of the firm's emails, since they mostly used reports from newspapers, think tanks and political science university departments. Various outlets said WikiLeaks' description of the Stratfor leak was "like one long toot on a dog-whistle for the paranoid" that the files "seem fairly low level and gossipy" that "this particular WikiLeaks dump should probably be taken to the dump and dumped" and that one seemingly incriminating email published by The New York Times turned out to have an innocuous narrative.

Former NSA Director Bobby Inman stated that the leak would be damaging to Stratfor's business. He had previously stated that Stratfor was competent, delivering high-quality intelligence analyses.

Max Fisher, the associate director of The Atlantic, argued that Stratfor has a poor reputation "among foreign policy writers, analysts, and practitioners" and that as a result Anonymous and Wikileaks have exaggerated the significance of the information they released. He also suggested that Assange may have targeted a relatively unimportant firm and over-hyped the results in order to "regain some of his former glory". Daniel W. Drezner, a professor of international politics at the Fletcher School at Tufts University, wrote in Foreign Policy that the "docu-dump says more about Wikileaks and Anonymous than it does about anything else" and criticized the hype of the release. Australian Broadcasting Corporation foreign correspondent and Stratfor subscriber Mark Corcoran also wrote that the e-mails showed Stratfor's methods used to gather information are similar to those employed by journalists, though he wrote that the quality of its reports are often inferior to news reports.
