= Jeremy Hammond =

American political activist and hacker

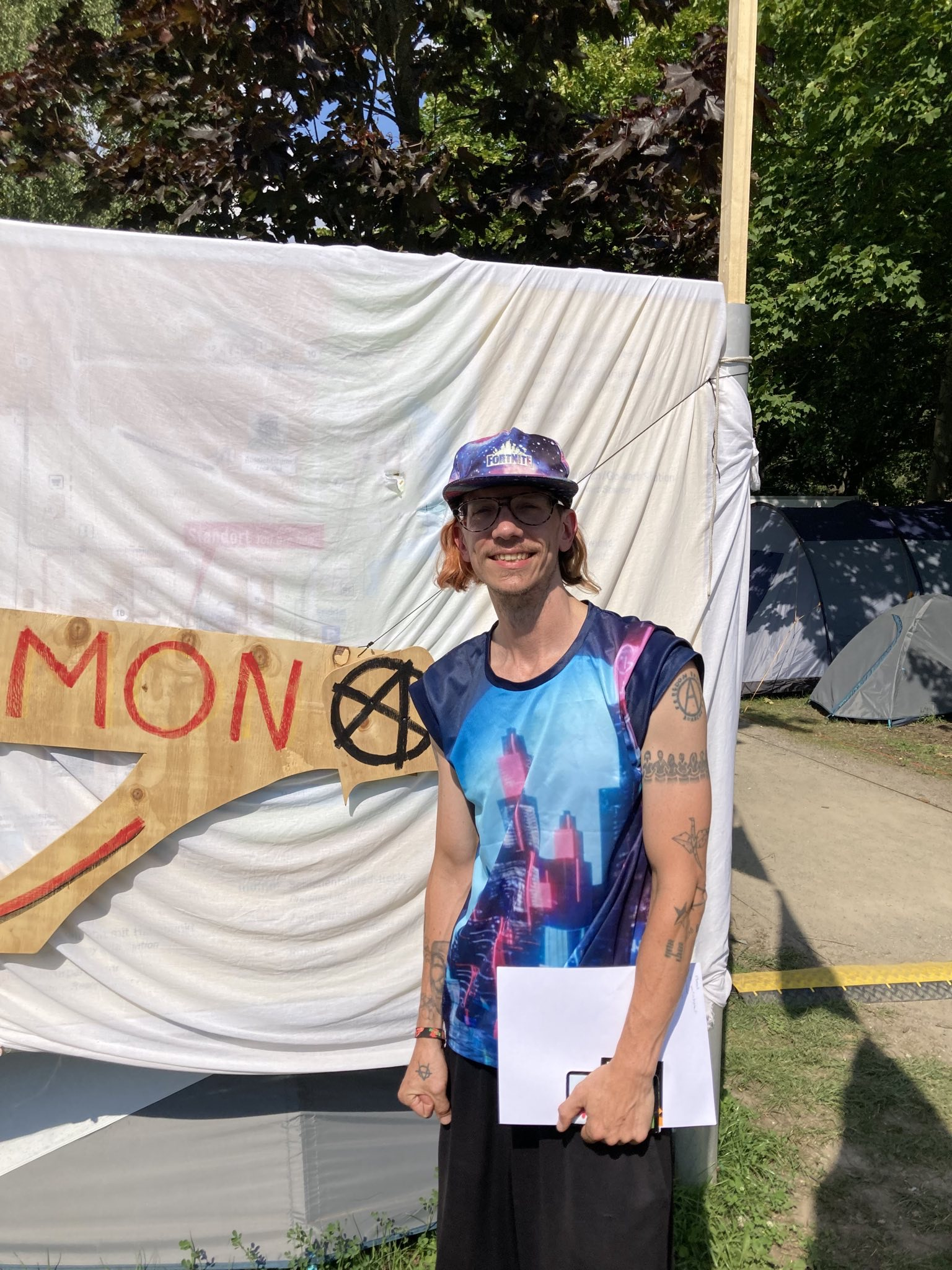
- Hammond at Chaos Communication Camp in 2023
- Born: Jeremy Alexander Hammond; January 8, 1985 (age 41); Chicago, Illinois, U.S.
- Occupation: Activist
- Website: hackthissite.org

Jeremy Alexander Hammond (born January 8, 1985), also known by his online moniker sup_g, is an American anarchist activist and former computer hacker from Chicago. He founded the computer security training website HackThisSite in 2003. He was first imprisoned over the Protest Warrior hack in 2005 and was later convicted of computer fraud in 2013 for hacking the private intelligence firm Stratfor and releasing data to WikiLeaks, and sentenced to 10 years in prison.

In 2019, he was summoned before a Virginia federal grand jury which was investigating WikiLeaks and its founder Julian Assange. He was held in civil contempt of court after refusing to testify on the principle of grand jury resistance.

He was released from prison in November 2020.

== Early life ==
Jeremy Alexander Hammond was born and raised in the Chicago suburb of Glendale Heights, Illinois, with his twin brother Jason. Hammond became interested in computers at an early age, programming video games in QBasic by age eight, and building databases by age thirteen. As a student at Glenbard East High School in the nearby suburb of Lombard, Hammond won first place in a district-wide science competition for a computer program he designed. While in high school, he became a peace activist, organizing a student walkout on the day of the Iraq invasion and starting a student newspaper to oppose the Iraq War. His high school principal described Hammond as "old beyond his years".

Hammond attended the University of Illinois at Chicago. In the spring of 2004, during his freshman year, he exploited a security flaw on the computer science department's website and went to department administrators, offering to help fix the security flaws on the site and looking to get a job. For inserting the backdoor, Hammond was called before the department chair and ultimately banned from returning for his sophomore year.

Jeremy, along with his brother Jason, has had a lifelong interest in music, performing in numerous bands through the years. Before Jeremy's arrests, they were both actively performing in the Chicago ska band Dirty Surgeon Insurgency.

Hammond worked as a Mac technician in Villa Park, Illinois. He also worked as a web developer for Chicago-based Rome & Company. His boss at Rome & Company wrote in 2010 that Hammond is "friendly, courteous and polite and while we suspect he has a low tolerance for corporate posturing, he has never demonstrated any contempt for business in the workplace".

== Activism and computer hacking ==
Hammond founded the computer security training website HackThisSite at age 18, during the summer after his high school graduation. The website describes itself as "a non-profit organization that strives to protect a good security culture and learning atmosphere". In its first two years the site received 2.5 million hits and acquired 110,000 members and a volunteer staff of 34.

During the 2004 DEF CON event in Las Vegas, Hammond delivered a talk that encouraged "electronic civil disobedience" as a means of protest against the 2004 Republican National Convention and its supporters.

In February 2005, Hammond, with others, hacked the website of pro-war counterprotesting group Protest Warrior and accessed thousands of credit card numbers, intending to use them to donate to left-wing groups. Although no charges were ever made against the cards, Hammond confessed and was sentenced to two years in federal prison for the crime. Freed after 18 months, Hammond was radicalized by the experience, although the terms of his probation prohibited him from associating with HackThisSite or anarchist groups for another three years.

=== Stratfor case ===
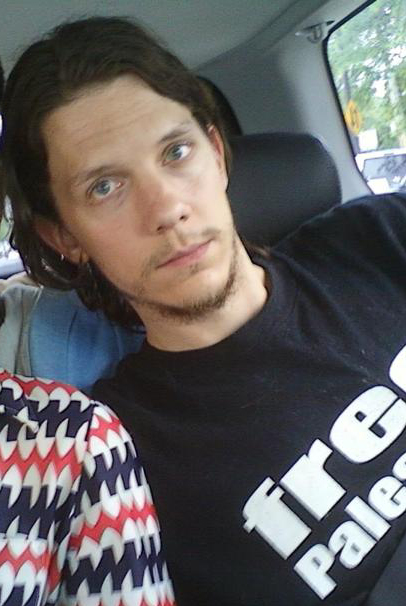
Hammond circa 2009

On March 5, 2012, Hammond was arrested by Federal Bureau of Investigation (FBI) agents in the Bridgeport neighborhood of Chicago for his involvement in the December 2011 cyberattack on Stratfor, a private intelligence firm. The intrusion compromised 60,000 credit card numbers, $700,000 in fraudulent charges, and involved the download of 5 million emails, some of which were subsequently published by WikiLeaks. The indictment was unsealed the following day in the Manhattan federal district court. He was one of six individuals from the United States, England and Ireland indicted.

The FBI was led to Hammond through information given by computer hacker Hector Xavier Monsegur ("Sabu"), who became a government informant immediately after his arrest in early 2011, and subsequently pleaded guilty in August 2011 to twelve counts of hacking, fraud, and identity theft. Although Monsegur could have received a sentence of more than 20 years in prison, prosecutors asked that he be sentenced to time served, which was seven months in prison. Information from Monsegur helped lead the authorities to at least eight co-conspirators, including Hammond, and helped to disrupt at least 300 cyberattacks.

The case was prosecuted by the office of Preet Bharara, the United States Attorney for the Southern District of New York. Hammond was represented by Elizabeth Fink.

Sabu was detained pending trial; in denying bail, Judge Loretta A. Preska described Hammond as "a very substantial danger to the community." In February 2013, the defense filed a motion asking presiding Judge Preska to recuse herself from the case on the basis that Preska's husband, Thomas Kavaler, had an email address released in the Stratfor disclosure and worked with Stratfor clients that were affected by the hack. Hammond's legal team argued that this created "appearance of partiality too strong to be disregarded". Preska denied the motion, claiming that the connections were inconsequential or unimportant.

In May 2013, Hammond pleaded guilty to one count of violating the Computer Fraud and Abuse Act (CFAA). Upon his guilty plea, Hammond issued a statement saying, "I did work with Anonymous to hack Stratfor, among other websites" and "I did what I believe is right." He maintained that he had no profit motive for the cyberattack. Hammond has insisted that he would not have carried out the breach of Stratfor's systems without the involvement of Sabu. Hammond was sentenced on November 15, 2013, to the maximum of ten years in prison, followed by three years of supervised release. He described his prosecution and sentence as a "vengeful, spiteful act." On November 17, 2020, Hammond was released from the Memphis Federal Correctional Institution and was transferred to a recovery house to serve the rest of his sentence.

In October 2019, Hammond was summoned before a Virginia federal grand jury which was investigating WikiLeaks and its founder Julian Assange. He was held in civil contempt of court by Judge Anthony Trenga after refusing to testify. Prosecutors granted Hammond immunity from prosecution based on any grand jury testimony, so Hammond could not refuse to testify on the ground of his right against self-incrimination. Like Chelsea Manning (who was also held in contempt for refusing to testify), Hammond said he was ideologically opposed to any grand jury probe which was not being conducted in "good faith" as the government already had the information it needed. In making his contempt ruling, Trenga stated that Hammond's arguments against testifying were "self-serving assertions … without support." Trenga ordered Hammond released in March 2020 after the conclusion of the grand jury, saying that prosecutors no longer required his testimony. Hammond was returned to federal prison to serve the balance of his 10 year sentence. Hammond may have received an early release in December 2019 had the grand jury not intervened.

Hammond was released from prison in November 2020.

=== Later life ===
In August 2024, Hammond was charged with spray painting an anarchist symbol on a police car during pro-Palestinian protests at the Democratic National Convention in Chicago.

== Personal life ==
He frequently identifies as an anarchist and has a shoulder tattoo of the anarchy symbol with the words: "Freedom, equality, anarchy." Writing after his arrest, Hammond said, "I have always made it clear that I am an anarchist-communist – as in I believe we need to abolish capitalism and the state in its entirety to realize a free, egalitarian society. I'm not into watering down or selling out the message or making it more marketable for the masses."

== See also ==
- Direct action
- Hacktivism
