= Fredrick Brennan =

American software developer, founder of 8chan (1994–2026)

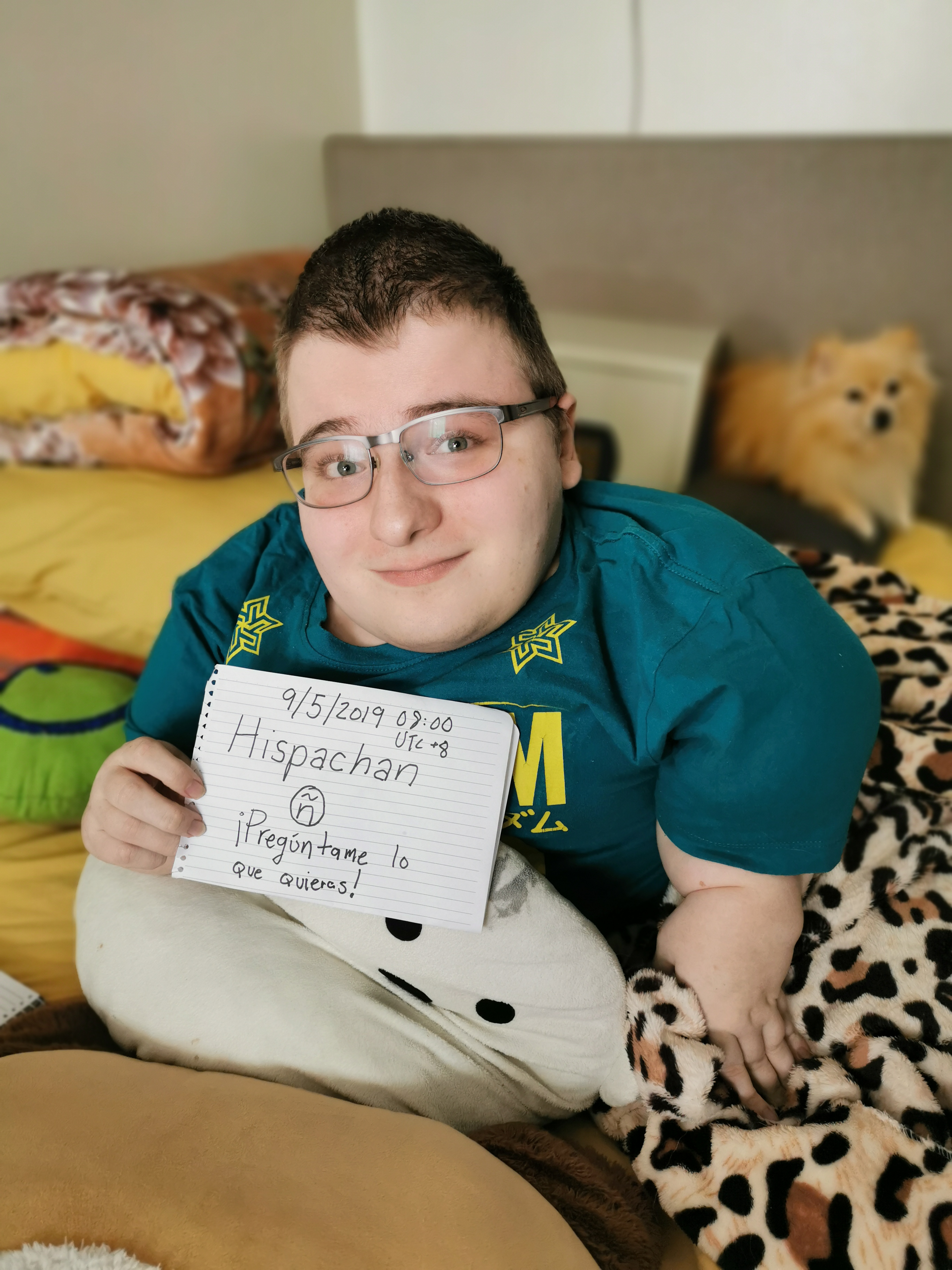
- Brennan in 2019, for identity verification on Hispachan
- Born: Fredrick Robert Brennan; February 21, 1994; Albany, New York, U.S.
- Died: January 10, 2026 (aged 31)
- Other name: Copypaste
- Occupations: Software developer, type designer
- Known for: Founder of 8chan

Fredrick Robert Brennan (February 21, 1994 – January 10, 2026) was an American software developer and type designer who founded the imageboard website 8chan in 2013, and repudiated it in 2019. Following 8chan's surge in popularity in 2014, largely due to the number of Gamergate proponents migrating to the site from 4chan, Brennan moved to the Philippines to work for Jim Watkins, who provided hosting services to 8chan and later became the site's owner.

Brennan cut ties with 8chan in 2016 and with Watkins in 2018. He then became an outspoken critic of both 8chan and Watkins, and battled to try to take 8chan offline. Brennan was also an outspoken critic of the QAnon conspiracy theory, which centers on 8chan posts by an anonymous figure named "Q", and Brennan researched who may be behind the Q identity.

== Background ==
Fredrick Brennan was born in Albany, New York, on February 21, 1994. He was born with osteogenesis imperfecta (OI), commonly known as brittle bone disease, which stunted his growth and required him to use a wheelchair. He estimated he had broken bones 120 times by the time he was 19. Brennan comes from a multi-generational family with OI, and his mother has the same condition. His parents divorced when Brennan was five years old. He and his younger brother were in the custody of their father and lived in Craryville until Brennan was 14, when his father put the boys in the New York State foster care system. Brennan had a poor relationship with his father. Brennan remained in foster care until he was 16 while his mother went through the legal proceedings to regain custody. He then lived with his mother in Atlantic City, New Jersey, until he was 18. After graduating from Atlantic City High School in 2012, he chose not to attend college.

In January 2014, after moving to New York, Brennan was robbed of almost $5,000 that he was saving up for a new wheelchair. When the suspect was arrested, Brennan went to the police station for a lineup, but when a bus did not come on the way back, he was left stranded in the snow and later had to be treated for hypothermia. He received a personal apology from New York City Police Commissioner William J. Bratton. His employer RazorClicks began a donation campaign to help gather the remaining funds for a new wheelchair; $15,000 USD ($20,400 in 2025 dollars) was raised in two months.

Brennan wrote an article in 2014 supporting the voluntary sterilization of people with similar severe inheritable genetic conditions. The article appeared on The Daily Stormer, a white supremacist and neo-Nazi website, which according to Brennan was the only outlet that would agree to publish it. Brennan developed a hatred of his parents for his life of constant pain, stating in an interview for Tortoise Media in 2019, "I don't want to speak for everybody with a disability, but I hate being disabled and I always have".

Brennan later became a Christian and ceased to believe in encouraging sterilization. In 2019, he considered having a child with his wife but maintained that he still believed in genetic testing for prospective parents with disabilities.

Brennan in the early 2010s identified himself as a libertarian; however, he became increasingly critical of the ideology, arguing that the libertarian approach to 8chan resulted in the creation of a system of feudalism. Brennan voted for Ron Paul in the 2012 United States presidential election. In 2016, he supported Bernie Sanders for president.

In August 2019, Brennan said he was studying Tagalog.

In July 2025, Brennan entered a romantic relationship with his assistant and caretaker Jay Brandstetter, who had moved in with Brennan in Atlantic City, New Jersey.

== Early computer use and independence ==
Brennan's disability restricted his play activities during his childhood, so he became "hooked" on his first computer at the age of six. Brennan taught himself to code, and wrote his first independent computer program at the age of 13. Brennan was active in Internet culture from an early age, and was a regular 4chan user since 2006, when he was 12 years old.

Brennan began doing freelance work immediately after graduating from high school. He started by doing tasks on Amazon Mechanical Turk, making $5,000 ($7,012 in 2025 dollars) in 2012 through the platform. He later became a "requester" (employer) for the service, which earned him enough money to move from his mother's home in Atlantic City, New Jersey, to Brooklyn, New York. There, he worked building websites as head of programming for RazorClicks, which does small business web marketing. The company paid the rent for his apartment and he worked a second job, remotely, for a Canadian company to pay for expenses.

In 2012, he joined Wizardchan, an Internet community for male virgins. According to Brennan, he bought Wizardchan from the original administrator in March 2013 and owned it until September 2013, when he resigned after losing his virginity.

== 8chan ==
In October 2013, Brennan launched 8chan, also called "Infinitechan" or "Infinitychan", after a month of raising pledges on Patreon. It started with a small but loyal following. He initially ran the site anonymously, known only as "copypaste", the username he used in IRC chatrooms. In May 2014, he was doxxed, and he decided to start putting his real name behind his work on 8chan.

After 4chan's founder and then-site admin, Christopher "moot" Poole, banned discussion related to Gamergate in September 2014, Brennan began advertising 8chan as a "free speech friendly 4chan alternative" where discussion boards would be managed by the users who created them, not by site moderators. In 2021, Brennan told an interviewer for Jacobin that he initially limited 8chan's rules to a prohibition on illegal activity out of laziness rather than ideological conviction.

Brennan himself became a prominent Gamergate voice; he went on to be interviewed about 8chan users' involvement in harassment of Brianna Wu on The David Pakman Show, and asked to debate about Gamergate on HuffPost Live and Al Jazeera America. As a result of the influx of Gamergate proponents, the site took off—Brennan said in an interview with Ars Technica that the site experienced over 4,000 posts an hour that month, a major increase from around 100 posts per hour prior to the 4chan rule change. 8chan became the second most popular English-language imageboard on the web. When asked about his thoughts on Gamergate by the Jacobin interviewer, Brennan said that "I was totally caught off guard. I did not know that this was about to happen." and that "When it did happen, I figured out what was going on alongside the other users. But I'll be perfectly honest. I had very good reasons to look the other way—look how popular my site is now. Am I really going to kick these guys off? They're having such a good time with all these features I wrote; it's finally working."

Brennan found it increasingly difficult to keep up with the server costs of the growing site, and the site experienced frequent downtime as multiple internet service providers denied service due to the site's objectionable content. Brennan was criticized for 8chan's pedophilia-related boards; Brennan said to The Daily Dot in 2014 that he personally found such content reprehensible, but he stood by his refusal to remove content that did not violate United States law. Due to the controversy surrounding the site, the crowdfunding site Patreon removed 8chan's fundraising page in January 2015, and the site registrar put the original domain 8chan.co on hold, each citing the presence of child abuse content. The registrar later relinquished control of the domain back to 8chan.

Jim Watkins, the owner of a web hosting company called N.T. Technology, contacted Brennan shortly after the site's surge in popularity to offer a partnership, under the condition that Brennan come to the Philippines to work for him. Brennan states he trusted Watkins because he knew Watkins operated the 2channel imageboard, though at the time he was unaware of the claim that Watkins had stolen the site from its founder. Brennan agreed to work for Watkins, and in late 2014 he moved to Manila to join him. Watkins, via N.T. Technology, began offering domain name services and hardware to host 8chan in 2014 into 2015, and Brennan continued to be responsible for the site's software development and community management.

In 2015, Watkins became the official owner and operator of 8chan. Brennan remained the site administrator until 2016, at which time he relinquished the role.

== Post-8chan ==
In 2016, Brennan resigned his role as 8chan's site administrator. Wired magazine reported he left the position due to stress; others have attributed his departure to Brennan's growing disgust with the site and its contents. Brennan continued to work for Watkins but stopped working on and posting at 8chan, continuing instead to work on the 2channel project. Jim Watkins's son, Ron Watkins, took up the site administrator role following Brennan's resignation. In December 2018, Brennan stopped working for Watkins and cut ties with the Watkins family, alleging that Jim Watkins had shown up at his home and berated him for asking to take time off.

Brennan became an outspoken critic of 8chan and of Watkins, and actively battled to try to take the site offline. Following the March 2019 Christchurch mosque shootings, in which the shooter posted his manifesto and links to a livestream of the attack to 8chan, Brennan told The Wall Street Journal that he no longer wanted to be involved in the imageboard world again, saying that "a lot of these sites cause more misery than anything else". Following the August 2019 El Paso shooting, in which the suspect allegedly posted a manifesto to 8chan before carrying out the attack, Brennan called for the site to be taken offline in an interview with The New York Times, saying: "It's not doing the world any good. It's a complete negative to everybody except the users that are there. And you know what? It's a negative to them, too. They just don't realize it." In an August 2019 appearance on the QAnon Anonymous podcast, Brennan said, "If they wanna bring 8chan back online, just be aware, I will do everything I can to keep it down because the world is better off without it."

After Watkins refused to take down 8chan in 2019, Brennan directed a number of tweets at him and the message board, calling Watkins "senile" and the site moderators "incompetent". Watkins responded by filing a lawsuit against Brennan, alleging Brennan had violated the Philippine Cybercrime Prevention Act of 2012, which makes "cyberlibel" a criminal offense that can be punished with prison time. Brennan said that Watkins filed the suit to try to intimidate and punish him.

On February 26, 2020, a Philippines court issued an arrest warrant for Brennan based on the complaint. Brennan said that because of his medical condition and the notoriously poor conditions in the Bureau of Immigration Bicutan Detention Center, an arrest by the Philippine authorities would likely result in his death. Brennan fled the Philippines hours before the warrant was issued, taking a different flight to avoid authorities who were looking for him at the airport. He fought the warrant from the United States.

In March 2020, the court suspended the case pending the outcome of an appeal by Brennan to the Philippines Department of Justice. Brennan initially took up residence in Van Nuys, California, in exile from the Philippines, before moving back with family on the East Coast, in late November 2020.

== Opposition to QAnon ==
Brennan also became a prominent opponent of QAnon, a conspiracy theory and political movement that originated in the far-right political sphere in 2017. He was a central figure in researching the identity of "Q", the anonymous figure behind imageboard posts that originated the conspiracy theory, who claims to be a high level government official with Q clearance and who purports to have access to classified information involving the Trump administration and its opponents in the United States. Q began posting on the 4chan imageboard in October 2017 but later moved to 8chan. Brennan believed that Jim and Ron Watkins have controlled the Q account since late 2017 or early 2018, which is when Brennan believed Ron Watkins used his access as the owner and operator of 8chan to seize the account from its original operator. Numerous journalists and conspiracy theory researchers have agreed with Brennan's assertion that the Watkinses are working with Q, know Q's identity, or control the Q account. In September 2020, Brennan refined his theory by positing that the original "Q" was a South African conspiracy theorist named Paul Furber and that Ron Watkins used his login privileges as 8chan's administrator to seize the Q account away from Furber. In early 2022, analyses conducted by two independent forensic linguistics teams supported Brennan's theory by identifying Paul Furber and Ron Watkins as the authors of the Q posts.

In October 2020, Brennan's research revealed that QMap, a popular website disseminating Q posts, was owned by Jim Watkins. The website was shut down shortly after.

== Font design ==
Post-8chan, Brennan developed several open-source computer fonts. Brennan's TT2020 font is a typewriter-style font with many variations on individual glyphs, which attempts to more realistically emulate the inconsistencies in characters that would be produced by a typewriter. Brennan's Chomsky font is a blackletter typeface based on the New York Times logo (which is handmade, not set from a typeface), with adjustments to make it more suitable for running text rather than mastheads alone. Brennan was also commissioned by Google to create a Baybayin font.

Brennan was a co-maintainer of the free and open-source software FontForge for a year and a half, starting shortly after he stopped working with Watkins. During that time he decided to create his own open-source font editing software, which he named MFEK, an acronym for "Modular Font Editor K" (originally 'MFEQ', after Q being his favorite letter). In an October 2020 interview for Know Your Meme, Brennan said he was motivated to create a new, user-friendly open-source font editor to "break font editing out of the hands of proprietary software", saying that Apple has outsized control of the font editing software market.

== Death ==
Brennan died in his sleep on January 10, 2026, at the age of 31.
