= Jim Watkins (businessman) =

American businessman and owner of 8chan (born 1963)

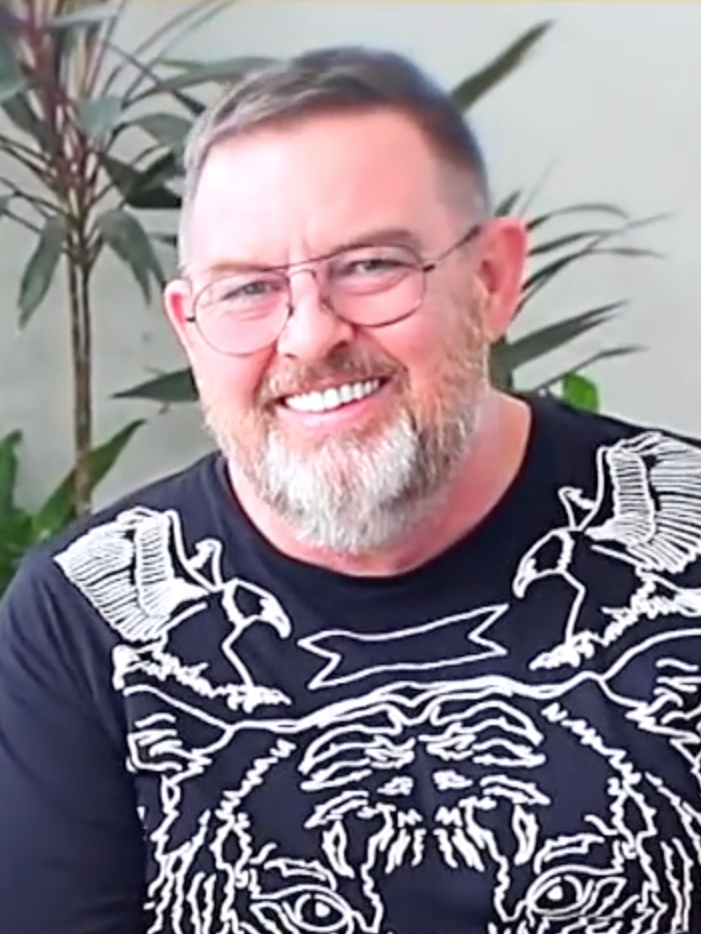
- Watkins in 2015
- Born: James Arthur Watkins; November 1963 (age 62–63); Dayton, Washington, U.S.
- Known for: Spreading of QAnon conspiracy theories Operator of 8chan and 2channel
- Children: Ron Watkins

James Arthur Watkins (born November 1963) is an American businessman, QAnon conspiracy theorist, and the operator of the imageboard website 8chan/8kun and textboard website 5channel. Watkins founded the company N.T. Technology in the 1990s to support a Japanese pornography website he created while he was enlisted in the United States Army. After leaving the Army to focus on the company, Watkins moved to the Philippines. In February 2014, Watkins became the operator of 2channel after he seized it from its creator and original owner, Hiroyuki Nishimura, later renaming it 5channel. He began providing domain and hosting services to 8chan later that year and became the site's official owner and operator by year's end.

Watkins and his son, Ron Watkins, are prominent advocates of the QAnon conspiracy theory, and have close ties to the Q movement.

== Early life ==
James Arthur Watkins was born in Dayton, Washington, in November 1963, and grew up on a family farm in Mukilteo, Washington. His mother worked for Boeing and his father worked for a phone company.

Watkins joined the United States Army in 1982 when he was 18 years old and served until 1998 or 1999. Over his time in the Army, he worked as a helicopter mechanic and recruiter; he reached the rank of sergeant first class in 1994. The Army sent him to a technology school in Virginia in 1987, where he learned about computers and the early Internet.

== Career ==
In 1998, while still enlisted, Watkins created a website for Japanese pornography called "Asian Bikini Bar". By hosting it in the United States, he was able to circumvent the strict pornography censorship in Japan. He later renamed the venture "N.T. Technology", which according to Watkins was a meaningless initialism meant to make pornography purchases less conspicuous on credit card statements. N.T. Technology, which is based in Reno, Nevada, initially sold advertising, and later also sold web hosting services to other Japanese adult entertainment websites that couldn't be hosted in Japan. In 1998 or 1999, during the dot-com boom, Watkins left the Army to focus on N.T. Technology. In October 2020, Mother Jones reported that N.T. Technology has hosted domains with names suggesting connections to child pornography, and that regardless of whether child pornography is hosted on the domains, Watkins is "profiting from words that appeal to the real thing". Watkins dismissed the claim as "an attempt to smear [his] name and print something awful".

Watkins has been involved in many business ventures. He operated an organic food restaurant in Manila, Philippines, which is now closed. In 2005, Watkins opened a Manila-based software business called Race Queen, which has subsequently been listed as the employer on Philippine work visas for several employees of Watkins'. Watkins also runs the Manila-based business Loki Technology. He has also been involved with a book narration company called books.audio; he narrated some of the books himself under the alias "A.J.". Watkins is also listed as the chairman of the board of a company called Emerald Pedistal, which sells piglets.

In 2016, around the time he purchased 8chan, Watkins created a news website called The Goldwater (named after former presidential candidate Barry Goldwater). The site's content has been described by The Washington Post as "notably conspiratorial and amateurish". The videos featured on The Goldwater were hosted by American associates of Watkins and by several "attractive Filipina women" who delivered pro-Trump news in heavily accented English. Watkins himself appeared in some of the videos under the alias Jim Cherney. Watkins intended the site to be "a public service to provide news to the 8chan community." However, it became unpopular with many 8chan users, which Watkins attributed to the fact that "Goldwater" is a Jewish-sounding name. One video addressed the Pizzagate conspiracy theory, with Watkins commenting that he believed that the child sex ring existed, though not that it was connected with a pizzeria. The highest point for The Goldwater came when it was accredited to cover Trump's June 2018 summit with Kim Jong-un in Singapore.

Watkins claimed in a September 2022 stream that he purchased doxxing forum Kiwi Farms after it had been removed from several web hosting services, and that he was looking to bring it and 8kun back to the clearnet. The announcement received mixed reactions from Kiwi Farm's userbase, and site owner Joshua Moon denied it in a Telegram post.

== Online anonymous communities ==
=== 2channel ===
2channel is a textboard website that is extremely popular in Japan, particularly among the very right-wing netto-uyoku. It was created in 1999 by Hiroyuki Nishimura, and is the predecessor to all other "chan" sites including 4chan and 8chan. Nishimura was believed to be making $1 million a year from advertising and premium memberships to 2channel in 2008. He hosted the site on N.T. Technology's servers. After a 2013 data breach exposed user credit card data, Watkins seized the 2channel domain in 2014, and took full control of the website and assumed the role of site administrator. He has continued to run the website since, renaming it to 5channel in October 2017 to avoid potential trademark litigation from Nishimura, who owns the "2channel" trademark.

Watkins has claimed he seized the 2channel domain because the loss of revenue from the data breach made Nishimura unable to pay hosting costs. Nishimura has claimed that he paid Watkins in full, and that Watkins' seizure of the domain constitutes domain hijacking.

=== 8chan ===
8chan, later renamed 8kun, is an imageboard website known for hosting alt-right and racist content, for its role in the Gamergate harassment campaign, and for its being the only site to host free talk about multiple mass shootings. The site was founded in October 2013 by Fredrick Brennan. After 4chan's founder, Christopher "moot" Poole, banned discussion related to Gamergate in September 2014, Brennan began advertising 8chan as a "free speech friendly 4chan alternative". The site took off—Brennan said in an interview with Ars Technica that the site experienced over 4,000 posts an hour that month, a major increase from around 100 posts per hour prior to the 4chan rule change. Brennan found it increasingly difficult to keep up with the server costs of the growing site, and the site experienced frequent downtime as multiple internet service providers denied service due to the site's objectionable content.

Watkins' son, Ron Watkins, told his father about the website after learning of it from an Al Jazeera America documentary about Brennan. The elder Watkins contacted Brennan to offer a partnership, under the condition that Brennan come to the Philippines to work for him. Brennan trusted Watkins because he knew he operated 2channel, though at the time he was unaware of the claim that Watkins had stolen the site from its founder. Brennan agreed to work for Jim Watkins, and in 2014 moved to Manila in the Philippines to join him. Watkins, via N.T. Technology, began offering domain name services and hardware to host 8chan in 2014 into 2015, and Brennan continued to be responsible for the site's software development and community management. In 2014, Watkins became the official owner and operator of 8chan. Brennan remained the site administrator until 2016, at which time he relinquished the role. Wired magazine reported he left the position due to stress; others have attributed his departure to Brennan growing disgusted with the site and its contents, and asking to be reassigned to work elsewhere. Brennan stopped working on and posting at 8chan, continuing instead to work for Watkins on the 2channel project. Ron Watkins took up the site administrator role following Brennan's resignation. In 2018, Brennan cut ties with the Watkins family, alleging that Jim Watkins had shown up at his home and berated him for asking to take time off. Brennan has since become an outspoken critic of 8chan and of Watkins, and has actively battled to try to keep the site offline.

In 2019, the perpetrators of the March Christchurch mosque shootings, the April Poway synagogue shooting, and the August El Paso shooting all used 8chan to disseminate their respective manifestos. The site was removed from the clearnet shortly after the August shooting due to suspensions of service from multiple providers, and did not return until November 2019. In August 2019, the United States House Committee on Homeland Security called Watkins to testify about 8chan's efforts to address "the proliferation of extremist content, including white supremacist content". The next month, Watkins traveled to Washington, D.C. for congressional questioning. The Philippines National Bureau of Investigation (NBI) and National Police (PNP) also launched investigations into Watkins and 8chan in August 2019 in relation to the shootings. As of September 2020, the NBI's investigation was closed and their findings were turned over to the PNP; the PNP's investigation was still open but had not resulted in charges against Watkins.

Watkins has attempted to earn money through 8chan, although the website has never been profitable. Posters on the website can pay, using a cryptocurrency created by Ron Watkins, to have their posts listed prominently through a program called "King of the Shekel". In a 2019 interview, The Washington Post asked if the name was antisemitic; Watkins hung up on them.

In October 2019, Watkins filed a cyberlibel case against Brennan for tweeting that Watkins was "senile" and that 8chan's moderators were "incompetent". Cyberlibel is a crime in the Philippines that can be punished with time in prison. Brennan has said that Watkins filed the suit to try to intimidate and punish him. On February 26, 2020, a Philippines court issued an arrest warrant for Brennan based on the complaint. Brennan, who has brittle bone disease, has said that because of his medical condition and the notoriously poor conditions in the Bureau of Immigration Bicutan Detention Center, arrest by the Philippine authorities would likely result in his death. Brennan fled the Philippines hours before the warrant was issued, taking a different flight to avoid authorities who were looking for him at the airport. He has been fighting the warrant from the United States. In March 2020, the court suspended the case pending the outcome of an appeal by Brennan to the Philippines Department of Justice.

On March 6, 2026, two domains connected to 5channel were permanently suspended by the registrar, Epik. According to an email from Epik shared by Watkins, the suspension was due to animal cruelty content and failure to moderate the platform in accordance with the registrar's terms of service. In addition, all of Watkin's accounts were suspended and any remaining domains were to be transferred away by March 9. The suspended domains were not eligible for transfer. 8kun.net was one of the domains likely to be affected, according to Watkins's statement on X.

== QAnon ==
QAnon is a discredited far-right conspiracy theory alleging that a cabal of Satan-worshiping pedophiles running a global child sex-trafficking ring is plotting against President Donald Trump, who is battling them. The theory has been promulgated by a mysterious person or group of people called "Q", who originally posted on 4chan but later moved to posting on 8chan. Q has said they will never post outside of 8chan. Many conspiracy theory researchers believe that Watkins or his son, Ron Watkins, are working with Q, know Q, or have assumed Q's identity. When 8chan was taken off the internet in August 2019 following three mass shootings, Q stopped posting; when it came back online in November, Q reappeared. QAnon researcher Marc-Andre Argentino said in March 2020 that based on an analysis of Q's posts, he believes Watkins has been posting as Q since autumn 2019. Also in March 2020, QAnon researcher Mike Rothschild said, "It would be very easy for the Q poster to use another forum or provide a cryptographic key to prove his authenticity on some other site, but instead they wait to post on this rickety version of 8chan. The only reason to keep Q on 8chan is because Watkins is personally connected to him." Fredrick Brennan quoted in The Atlantic in June 2020 said, "I definitely, definitely, 100 percent believe that Q either knows Jim or Ron Watkins, or was hired by Jim or Ron Watkins." ABC News reported that a prominent website for "Q drops", called "QMap.pub", shared the same content delivery network as 8kun. Brian Friedberg, a senior researcher at Harvard's Shorenstein Center, said: "Regardless of whether he is doing any direct posting, or encouraging what the content is, the Watkins family and the 8kun crew have a remarkable amount of control over what's turning into an international movement". In an interview on a September 2020 episode of the podcast Reply All, Brennan explained that he believes the Q account was originally operated by someone else, but that Watkins and his son took control of the persona, most likely around December 2017. PJ Vogt of Reply All has said he discussed Brennan's theory with other journalists who write about Q, and that "some of them think it's likely, everyone agrees it's more than plausible". Watkins has denied knowledge of Q's identity, as has his son, Ron Watkins. When Watkins testified before the United States House Committee on Homeland Security in September 2019, he wore a QAnon pin.

In February 2020, Watkins formed a super PAC called "Disarm the Deep State", which backs political candidates who support the QAnon conspiracy theory. Watkins is listed as the group's treasurer. Benjamin Barr, an attorney who has represented Watkins in the past and who is known for his involvement with the American right-wing activist group Project Veritas, also helped with the super PAC. As of August 31, 2020, the super PAC had raised less than $4,000 and spent less than $700, with none of the spending going towards federal candidates. In November 2020, Washington Monthly reported that the "Disarm the Deep State" super PAC had raised just 4,736 dollars, including a 500 dollars loan from Watkins' lawyer.

Media Matters for America reported in April 2020 that the super PAC was buying advertisements from Watkins to place on the 8chan website, and that it was one of the only groups advertising on the site. A QAnon researcher named Mike Rains said of Watkins and Q, "Watkins always made it seem like there was distance between him and Q, that Q was just this guy posting on his forums, that he let Q post because he's a free speech absolutist. By launching this PAC he is fully admitting that he is working with whoever is posting as Q and he is now part of the grift that is QAnon." In October 2020, Watkins was a featured speaker at Q Con Live!, a conference for QAnon adherents that was held in Scottsdale, Arizona.

Twitter permanently suspended Watkins' account on January 8, 2021, along with other accounts they found to be "solely dedicated to sharing QAnon content", including that of his son, Ron Watkins, and the accounts of former Trump attorney Sidney Powell and former national security adviser Michael Flynn. The account bans happened two days after the United States Capitol attack.

On June 6, 2022, while testifying under oath to the United States House Select Committee on the January 6 Attack, Watkins distanced himself from the conspiracy theory and claimed that QAnon is "manufactured by the left-wing media", "mostly" by Media Matters which he said is "funded by George Soros".

== Personal life ==
While Watkins was stationed in South Korea with the Army, he met his first wife, Ton Sun Watkins. In 1987, they had their first child, Ronald "Ron" Watkins. The family moved often because of Watkins' military service, spending the longest period in Mukilteo, Washington. Watkins and Ton Sun divorced when their son was a teenager, at which point his son began to live primarily with Ton Sun.

In October 2001, Watkins traveled to Manila in the Philippines and married his second wife, Liezel, three weeks after arriving. Watkins began moving to the Philippines in 2004, and started living there permanently in 2007. Watkins split his time between a pig farm outside of Manila and a condominium in the city. During the 2010s, Watkins' son Ron moved to Manila to live with him. Ron served as 8chan's site administrator from 2016 until 2020.

In January 2020, the Investigations Division of the Philippines Bureau of Immigration (BI) designated Watkins an "undesirable alien". This is an administrative, not criminal, determination that a person is a "risk to the public interest", and although it indicates a person is able to be deported, it is up to the commissioner of the bureau whether to pursue deportation. Immigration records obtained by ABC News said that Watkins "is the owner and operator of 8chan, a hate filled forum/website which hosts trolling and serves as go-to resource for violent extremists and white supremacists". According to Watkins' brother-in-law, Watkins sold his pig farm and in August 2020 returned to the United States. According to ABC News, if Watkins did not return to the Philippines by January 31, 2021, to appeal the BI's designation, he would be denied reentry to the country. According to an April 2021 article in The Independent, Watkins was expected to return to the Philippines to appeal the decision.

Watkins' interests include yoga and fountain pens. He has recorded videos on YouTube about these subjects. He also uses his YouTube channel to publish videos of himself singing hymns and reading Bible verses.
