= Anonymous post =

Method of communication

Anonymous posts on a 4chan board. Responses are directed towards the ID number of the post, rather than the username.

An anonymous post is an entry on a textboard, anonymous bulletin board system, or other discussion forums like Internet forum, without a screen name or more commonly by using a non-identifiable pseudonym. Some online forums such as Slashdot do not allow such posts, requiring users to be registered either under their real name or utilizing a pseudonym. Others like JuicyCampus, AutoAdmit, 2channel, and other Futaba-based imageboards (such as 4chan) thrive on anonymity. Users of 4chan, in particular, interact in an anonymous and ephemeral environment that facilitates rapid generation of new trends.

== History of online anonymity ==
Online anonymity can be traced to Usenet newsgroups in the late 1990s where the notion of using invalid emails for posting to newsgroups was introduced. This was primarily used for discussion on newsgroups pertaining to certain sensitive topics. There was also the introduction of anonymous remailers which were capable of stripping away the sender's address from mail packets before sending them to the receiver. Online services which facilitated anonymous posting sprang up around mid-1992, originating with the cypherpunk group.

The precursor to Internet forums like 2channel and 4chan were textboards like Ayashii World and Amezou World that provided the ability for anonymous posts in Japan. These "large-scale anonymous textboards" were inspired by the Usenet culture and were primarily focused on technology, unlike their descendants.

Today, image boards receive tremendous Internet traffic from all parts of the world. In 2011, on 4chan's most popular board, /b/, there were roughly 35,000 threads and 400,000 posts created per day. At that time, that level of content was on par with YouTube. Such high traffic suggests a broad demand from Internet users for anonymous content sharing sites.

== Levels of anonymity ==
Anonymity on the Internet can pertain to both the utilization of pseudonyms or requiring no authentication at all (also called "perfect anonymity") for posting on a website. Online anonymity is also limited by IP addresses. For example, WikiScanner associates anonymous Wikipedia edits with the IP address that made the change and tries to identify the entity that owns the IP address. On other websites, IP addresses may not be publicly available, but they can be obtained from the website administrators only through legal intervention. They might not always be traceable to the poster.

== Techniques ==
Utilizing pseudonyms allow people to post without revealing their real identity. Pseudonyms, however, are still prone to being tracked to the user's IP address. To avoid being tracked to an IP address, it is possible to post via a public computer where the IP address would usually be under the purview of the public workspace such as a coffee shop, and hence cannot be traced to the individual user. Adversarial stylometry can be employed to resist identification by writing style.

=== Memes ===
Another way people are posting anonymously online is through the use of memes. One popular meme is the Confession Bear meme. People use Confession Bear to post everything from funny and embarrassing stories to very troubled thoughts.

=== Technology ===
There are services described as anonymizers which aim to provide users the ability to post anonymously by hiding their identifying information. Anonymizers are essentially proxy servers which act as an intermediary between the user who wants to post anonymously and the website which logs user information such as IP addresses. The proxy server is the only computer in this network which is aware of the user's information and provides its own information to anonymize the poster. Examples of such anonymizers include Tor and I2P, which employ techniques such as onion and garlic routing (respectively) to provide enhanced encryption to messages that travel through multiple proxy servers.

Applications like PGP utilizing techniques like private-key and public-key encryptions are also utilized by users to post content in Usenet groups and other online forums.

== Legal standards and regulations ==
=== China ===
The revised draft of the Chinese government's "Internet Information Services" proposes that "Internet information service providers, including microblogs, forums, and blogs, that allow users to post information on the Internet should ensure users are registered with their real identities". Starting October 1, 2017, it will require Internet users to identify themselves with their real names to use comments sections on news and social media websites.

=== The Philippines ===
The Philippine government passed the Cybercrime Prevention Act on 12 September 2012, which among other things grants the Department of Justice the ability to "block access to 'computer data' that is in violation of the Act; in other words, a website hosting criminally libelous speech could be shut down without a court order".

=== United Kingdom ===
Under the Defamation Act 2013, in an action against a website operator, on a statement posted on the website, it is a defense to show that it was not the operator who posted the statement on the website. The defense is defeated if it was not possible for the claimant to identify the person who posted the statement.

=== United States ===
In the United States, the right to speak anonymously online is protected by the First Amendment and various other laws. These laws restrict the ability of the government and civil litigants to obtain the identity of anonymous speakers. The First Amendment says that "Congress shall make no law ... abridging the freedom of speech, or of the press". This protection has been interpreted by the U.S. Supreme Court to protect the right to speak anonymously offline.

For example, in McIntyre v. Ohio Elections Commission, the Supreme Court overturned an Ohio law banning the distribution of anonymous election pamphlets, claiming that an "author's decision to remain anonymous ... is an aspect of the freedom of speech protected by the First Amendment" and that "anonymous pamphleteering is not a pernicious, fraudulent practice, but an honorable tradition of advocacy and of dissent", as well as a "shield" against the so-called tyranny of the majority. Various courts have interpreted these offline protections to extend to the online world.

Identifying the author of an anonymous post may require a Doe subpoena. This involves gaining access to the IP address of the poster via the hosting website. The courts can then order an Internet service provider to identify the subscriber to whom it had assigned said IP address. Requests for such data are almost always fruitful, though providers will often effect a finite term of data retention (in accordance with the privacy policy of each—local law may specify a minimum and/or maximum term). The usage of IP addresses has, in recent times, been challenged as a legitimate way to identify anonymous users.

On March 21, 2012, the New York State Senate introduced the bill numbered S.6779 (and A.8668) labeled as the "Internet Protection Act". It proposes the ability of a website administrator of a New York–based website to take down anonymous comments unless the original author of the comment agrees to identify themselves on the post.

== In online communities ==
Online communities vary with their stances on anonymous postings. Wikipedia allows anonymous editing in most cases, but does not label users, instead identifying them by their IP addresses. Other editors commonly refer to these users with neutral terms such as "anons" or "IPs".

Many online bulletin boards require users to be signed in to write—and, in some cases, even to read—posts. 2channel and other Futaba-based image boards take an opposite stance, encouraging the anonymity, and in the case of English-language Futaba-based websites, calling those who use usernames and tripcodes "namefags" and "tripfags", respectively. As required by law, even communities such as 4chan do require the logging of IP addresses of such anonymous posters. Such data, however, can only be accessed by the particular site administrator.

Slashdot discourages anonymous posting by displaying "Anonymous Coward" as the author of each anonymous post. The mildly derogatory term is meant to chide anonymous contributors into logging in.

== Ramifications ==
=== Effects on users ===
The effects of posting online anonymously has been linked to the online disinhibition effect in users whilst been categorized into either benign or toxic disinhibition. Disinhibition can result in misbehavior but can also improve user relationships. It may also result in greater disclosure among Internet users, allowing more emotional closeness and openness in a safe social context.

Anonymous computer communication has also been linked to accentuate self-stereotyping. Although it has been linked to notable effects in gender differences, only when the topic bears similarity and fits with the gender stereotype.

A 2015 study suggested that anonymous news comment sections are more susceptible to uncivil comments, especially those directed at other users. Anonymous news comment section users are also more likely to be impolite by either being sarcastic and casting aspersions.

With regard to a recent hostile subpoena in California, commentators have asked if there will be a "Layfield & Barrett effect" chilling job review posting free speech. On May 2, 2016, through its lawyers, Layfield and Barrett and partner Phil Layfield issued a subpoena on Glassdoor seeking the online identities of former employees who posted extremely critical and negative reviews. Glassdoor executives have stated that they will fight the subpoena as they have fought off other efforts to disclose anonymous identities in the recent past. Other litigants in California have won their right to anonymously post negative job reviews but the law remains hotly contested.

=== Effects on online communities ===
The conditions for deindividuation, such as "anonymity, reduced self-awareness, and reduced self-regulation," fosters creations of online communities much in the same way that they might be employed offline. This is evident in proliferation of communities such as Reddit or 4chan which utilize total anonymity or pseudonymity, or tools such as Informers (which add anonymity to non anonymous social media like Facebook or Twitter), to provide its users the ability to post varied content. The effect of disinhibition has been seen to be beneficial in "advice and discussion threads by providing a cover for more intimate and open conversations".Anonymous posting can lower social pressure and self-censorship, allowing users to express honest or controversial opinions more freely. Anonymous posting is used by whistleblowers to share sensitive information without revealing their identity.

The "ephemerality", or short-lived nature, of posts that exist on some anonymous image boards such as 4chan create a fast-paced environment. As of 2009, threads on 4chan had a median lifespan of 3.9 minutes.

There is also research suggesting that content that gets posted in such communities also tends to be more deviant in nature than would be otherwise. The ability to post anonymously has also been linked to the proliferation of pornography in newsgroups and other online forums wherein users utilize sophisticated mechanisms such as mentioned in technology.

== See also ==
- Anonymous social media
- Anonymous Online Speakers v. United States District Court for the District of Nevada, (In re Anonymous Online Speakers), 611 F.3d 653 (2010)
- McIntyre v. Ohio Elections Commission, 514 U.S. 334 (1995)
- John Doe
