= Futaba Channel =

Japanese imageboard website

Futaba Channel ふたば☆ちゃんねる
- Logo

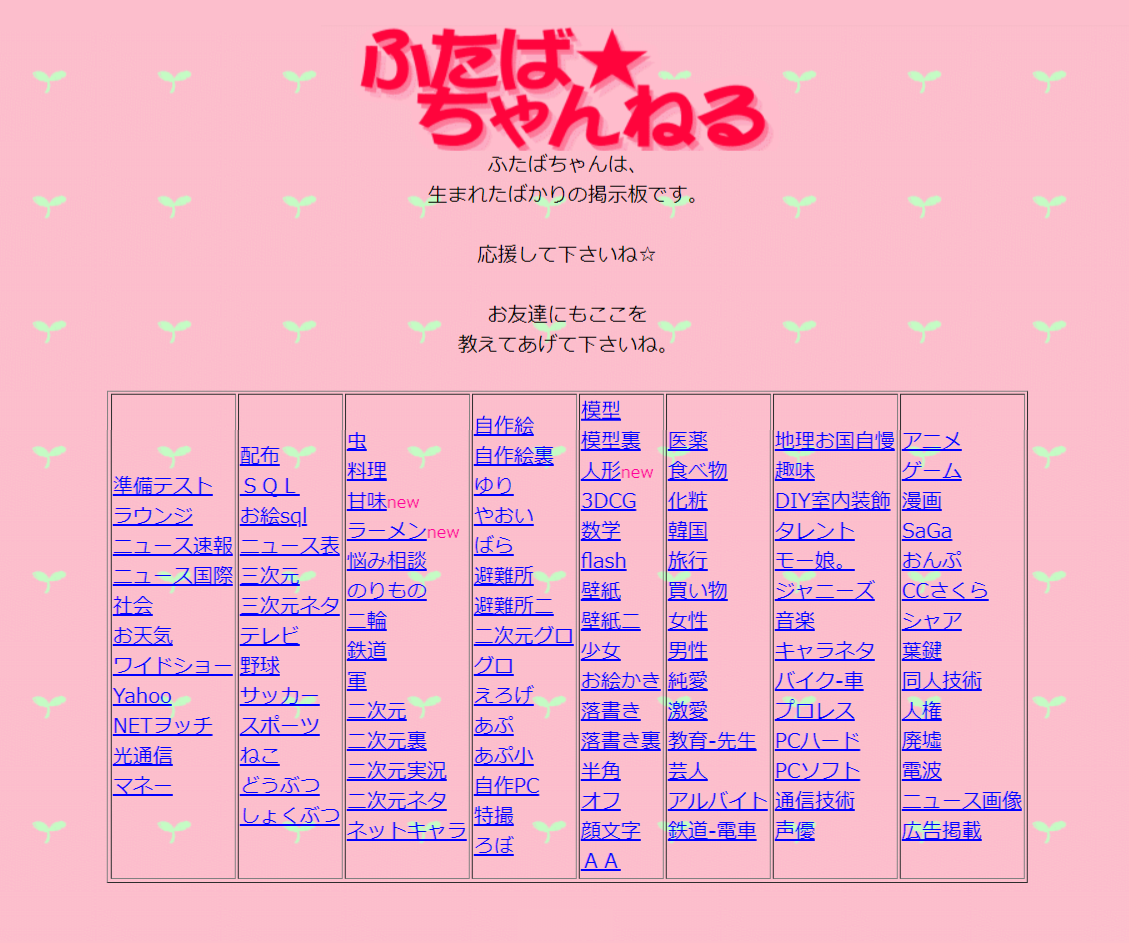
- Main page
- Website type: Imageboard
- Available in: Japanese
- Revenue: Advertisements
- Website: www.2chan.net
- Commercial: No
- Registration: None available
- Launched: 30 August 2001; 25 years ago
- Current status: Active

Futaba Channel (Japanese: ふたば(双葉)☆ちゃんねる, Hepburn: Futaba Channeru; "Double Leaf Channel", "Two Leaf Channel"), or Futaba for short, also sometimes called 2chan, is a Japanese imageboard. Users of the website can upload pictures and discuss a wide variety of topics, from daily personal problems to sports, ramen, otaku and subcultures.

== Origin ==
Futaba Channel was set up on August 30, 2001, as a refuge for 2channel users when 2channel was in danger of shutting down. It started as a textboard but eventually added imageboards based on the GazouBBS software. This would later become inspiration for the English-language imageboard 4chan website, which was based on Futaba.

== Concept ==
Futaba Channel consists of about 60 imageboards (three of which are oekaki boards) and about 40 textboards, with topics ranging from daily personal problems to food, sports, ramen, and pornography. There are also two places to upload general non-image files. Futaba is powered by a custom script based on GazouBBS (gazou.php, from 画像, gazō, meaning "image"). The Futaba script was open source (last updated in 2005) and its descendants are used to run many Japanese and English imageboards.

== Culture ==
Futaba has spawned a number of visual gags and characters, some of which have spread to western internet culture such as the OS-tans meme. Several characters that appear on Futaba Channel have appeared in the real world in the form of various real-life goods, such as figures, dolls or images printed on pillows. Such items are mainly produced by Japanese dōjin artists and groups.

Non-Japanese Internet users sometimes refer to Futaba Channel as 2chan, due to the URL of the site. This frequently leads to confusion as it is unclear if the term is intended to mean Futaba Channel or 2channel, and sometimes it even refers to both, as if they were a single website.

== Features ==
=== del Function ===
Since September 27, 2008, a function to report a post that violates the forum's rules and to request its deletion was added to each board of Futaba channel. It consists of a hyperlink with the text "del" that appears in the upper right corner of the thread; clicking on it opens the "Form for deletion request" page, where the type of reported content can be specified. Reasons for reporting a thread include usage of indecent pictures, child pornography, doxxing, slander, intimidation, spamming, harassment, etc.

In response to these reports, administrators of the site can proceed to delete the offending image, reply to the entire thread, and block public access to it. If the offense is deemed severe enough, there's a possibility for the IP address of the poster to be displayed publicly. In these cases the IP address is displayed using red numbers; these posters became known then as akaji (赤字; lit. "red letters"). According to comments from the administrators, there are also cases where the information of the person who initiated the report is saved.

In addition, a function was added to all ID-less boards in July 2013 where, upon the number of deletion requests exceeding a certain threshold, the ID of an otherwise anonymous poster is revealed forcibly.

=== Thread isolation ===
On some boards, when the number of reports of a thread surpasses a certain number, they disappear from the normal catalog and become "isolated". The isolated threads can then only be accessible through its corresponding URL. In the past, the threads were moved to a special board called "isolation" (隔離) where they could be accessed through the site's homepage.

== See also ==
- 2channel
- 4chan
- Shift JIS art
