= Ron Watkins =

American conspiracy theorist and imageboard administrator (born 1987)

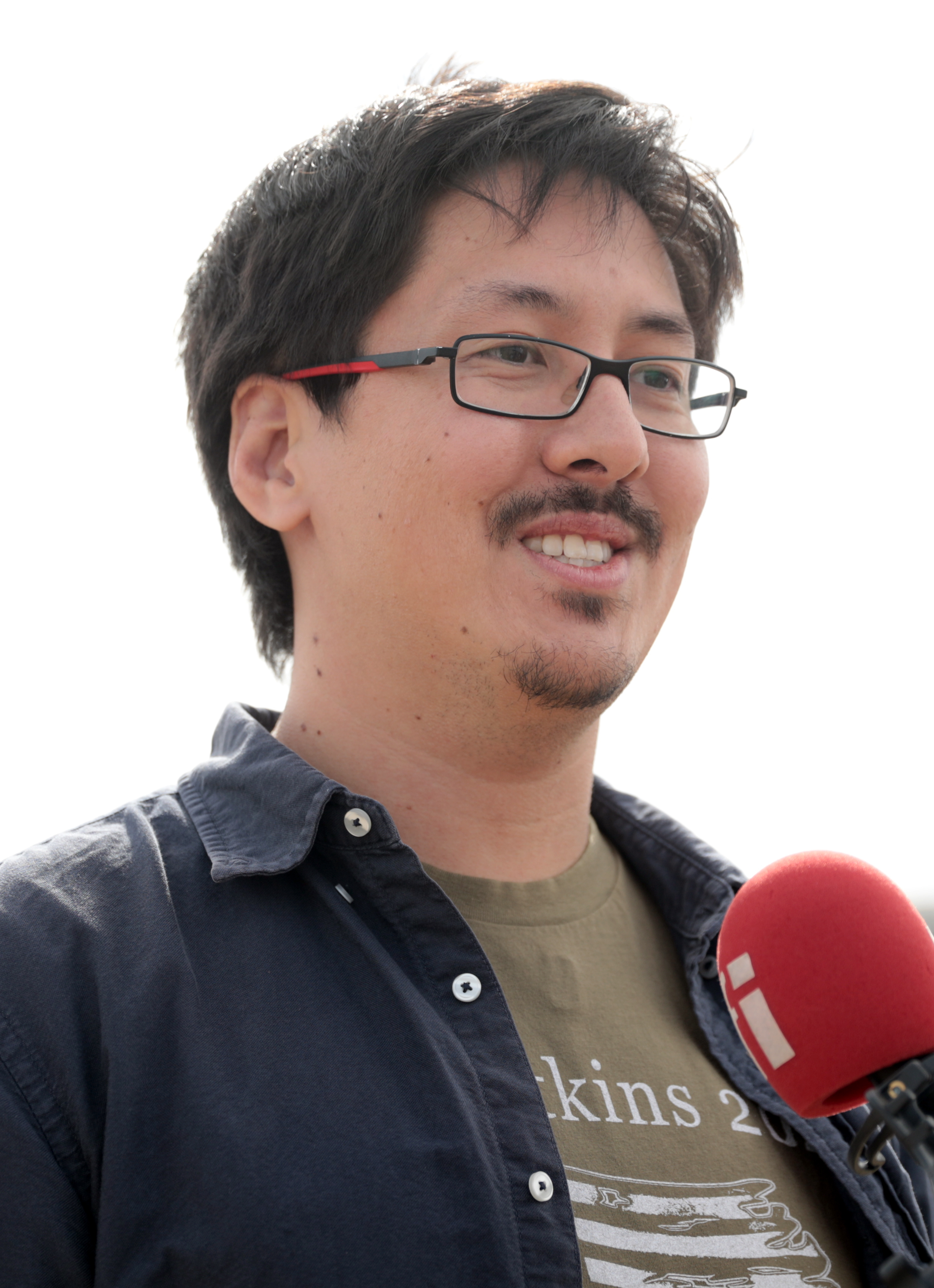
- Watkins in 2022
- Born: Ronald Watkins; April 18, 1987 (age 39)
- Other name: CodeMonkeyZ
- Known for: Spreading of QAnon conspiracy theories Administration of 8kun
- Father: Jim Watkins

Ronald Watkins (born April 18, 1987), also known by his online pseudonym CodeMonkeyZ, is a site administrator of the imageboard website 8kun (formerly known as 8chan). He has played a major role in spreading the discredited far-right QAnon conspiracy theory, and has espoused conspiracy theories that widespread election fraud led to Joe Biden's victory over Donald Trump in the 2020 U.S. presidential election. He is the son of Jim Watkins, the owner and operator of 8kun.

Numerous journalists and researchers believe that one or both of the Watkinses know the identity of, or are themselves, "Q", the person or group of people behind QAnon.

Watkins served as site administrator for 8kun from 2016 until he announced he had resigned in November 2020, though some have questioned the legitimacy of his resignation.

== Early life ==
Watkins was born in 1987. His father, Jim Watkins, is a former member of the United States Army, and Watkins grew up moving often because of his father's military service. His mother, Ton Sun Watkins, is from South Korea, and his parents met when his father was stationed there. They divorced when Watkins was a teenager, at which point Watkins began to live mostly with his mother.

Watkins spent his high school years in Mukilteo, Washington, the city where he lived for the longest period during his childhood. He attended Kamiak High School, where he was active in choir and theater, and graduated in 2005.

== Activities ==
=== 8kun ===
8kun, which was formerly known as 8chan, is an imageboard website that has been linked to white supremacism, neo-Nazism, the alt-right, child pornography, racism, and antisemitism, hate crimes, and multiple mass shootings. It was home to the proponents of the Gamergate controversy beginning in 2014, and in 2018 became a central part of the QAnon conspiracy theory when "Q", the anonymous figure claiming to be a high-level government official with Q clearance, began exclusively using 8kun to post their messages.

In 2014, after seeing an Al Jazeera America documentary about 8kun creator Fredrick Brennan, Watkins told his father about Brennan. The imageboard had recently taken off in popularity after it was adopted by proponents of Gamergate, and Brennan was having trouble keeping up with server costs. The elder Watkins contacted Brennan to offer a partnership, and in 2014, Brennan moved to Manila in the Philippines to work for him. In 2014, Jim Watkins became the official owner and operator of 8kun. Ron Watkins began working on the site every day. Brennan remained the site administrator until 2016, at which time he relinquished the role and Ron Watkins took up the position.

Watkins was responsible for the creation of a cryptocurrency through which 8kun posters can pay to have their posts listed prominently through a program called "King of the Shekel".

On November 3, 2020, the day of the United States presidential election, Watkins announced on Twitter that he was resigning his position as site administrator. He told journalists he wanted to spend more time woodworking and writing a book about constitutional law. His resignation was described as "abrupt", and fed doubts among some QAnon adherents about the movement. Some have questioned the veracity of his resignation. Conspiracy theory researcher Julian Feeld said, "His 'departure' from 8kun is highly suspect and possibly just a PR move more than anything else... It allows him more freedom as a right-wing operative, specifically around the various voter fraud conspiracy theories."

=== Role in QAnon ===
QAnon is a discredited far-right conspiracy theory alleging that a cabal of Satan-worshiping pedophiles running a global child sex-trafficking ring is plotting against former President Donald Trump, who is battling them. Watkins has played a major role in helping to amplify the theory. According to conspiracy theory expert Julian Feeld, QAnon adherents see Watkins as "the technical brain behind the platform where Q posts". Feeld has said that despite Watkins' lower profile in the movement compared to his father, he has "played just as big a role in the... movement's growth". Watkins has been described as a de facto QAnon leader.

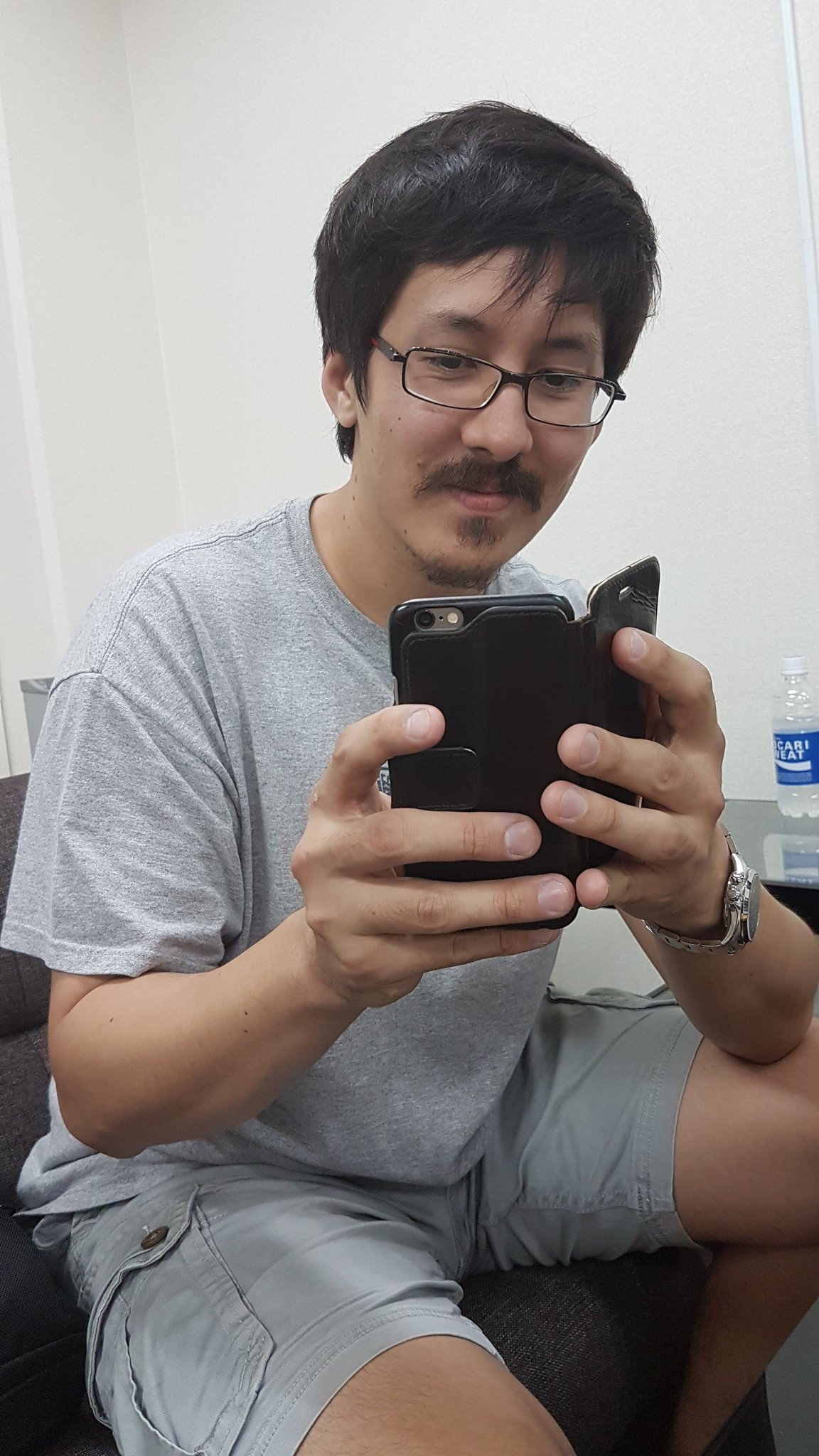
Watkins in 2018

Numerous journalists and conspiracy theory researchers have connected Ron, Jim, or both Watkinses to Q, an account run by an unknown person or group of people, whose posts are the basis of the QAnon conspiracy theory. Watkins and his father were two of only a few people who could verify that posts on 8kun were from the "real" Q, which also contributed to theories that they were behind the persona.

Fredrick Brennan was quoted in a June 2020 article in The Atlantic saying, "I definitely, definitely, 100 percent believe that Q either knows Jim or Ron Watkins, or was hired by Jim or Ron Watkins." In an interview on a September 2020 episode of the podcast Reply All, Brennan explained that he believes the Q account was originally operated by someone else, but that Watkins and his father took control of the persona, most likely around December 2017. PJ Vogt of Reply All has said he discussed Brennan's theory with other journalists who write about Q, and that "some of them think it's likely; everyone agrees it's more than plausible". Both Watkinses have denied knowledge of Q's identity. In September 2020, Brennan theorized that the original "Q" was a South African 4chan poster called Paul Furber, and that once Q moved to 8chan, Ron Watkins used his login privileges as the forum's administrator to take control of the account.

A verified account on Parler claiming to be Watkins made several posts on November 15, 2020, appearing to confirm theories that his father was Q. It was later determined that security researcher Aubrey Cottle had taken advantage of Parler security flaws to change the name of an already-verified Parler account, giving it the appearance of belonging to and having been verified as Watkins. This incident led to a feud between Watkins and Parler investor Dan Bongino, with Watkins publicly criticizing Parler's security on Twitter and describing the service as "compromised". Bongino responded by tweeting insults at Watkins.

Watkins and his father were interviewed over several years for Cullen Hoback's six-part HBO docuseries about QAnon and the identity of Q, titled Q: Into the Storm. In the final episode of the series, Watkins said in an interview, "It was basically three years of intelligence training, teaching normies how to do intelligence work. It was basically what I was doing anonymously before, but never as Q." Watkins then smiled and corrected himself, saying "Never as Q. I promise. Because I am not Q, and I never was". Hoback viewed this as a freudian slip, and concluded from this interview and his other research that Ron Watkins is Q.

On February 19, 2022, The New York Times reported that linguistic analysis of the Q posts by two forensic linguistic teams indicated that Paul Furber was the main author of the initial Q posts, and Ron Watkins took over in 2018. Watkins again denied being Q, and published on Telegram a sonnet rebutting the claims.

=== Attempts to overturn the 2020 U.S. presidential election ===
After resigning from his 8kun position in November 2020, Watkins worked to build his reputation among those attempting to overturn the results of the presidential election. He spread conspiracy theories about Dominion Voting Systems, the creators of some voting machines used in the election. He posted videos on Twitter of a Dominion employee using one of the machines, falsely stating that the employee was pictured tampering with election results. The employee received death threats as a result, and a noose was found hanging outside his home.

Watkins was named as an expert witness in a lawsuit filed by Sidney Powell, a lawyer and conspiracy theorist also involved in challenging the election results. In his affidavit, he claimed that based on his reading of the online user guide for the Dominion software, it is "within the realm of possibility" for a poll worker to manipulate votes. According to The Washington Post, Watkins described himself in the affidavit as "an information security expert with nine years of experience as a 'network and information defense analyst' and security engineer", and did not mention that his experience mostly came from his work with 8kun.

Watkins was interviewed multiple times about Dominion on the pro-Trump One America News Network (OANN), which introduced him as a "large system technical analyst". His comments on electoral fraud were also reported by other right-wing outlets, including The Gateway Pundit.

Watkins earned a large following on Twitter following the election, where he used the name "CodeMonkeyZ". In the month of November he nearly doubled his follower count to 400,000, and by early January had more than 500,000 followers. Trump had retweeted Watkins five times between Election Day and January 6, 2021, and Foreign Policy described Watkins as "an integral part of Trump's post-election messaging".

On the night of January 5, 2021, the day before the U.S. Capitol attack, Watkins told his father and filmmaker Cullen Hoback that he was about to "make a claim, it's going to shatter some institutions". On Twitter, Watkins announced plans to "drop" information he called "The Mother of All [truth] Bombs". According to Hoback, Watkins claimed to have received a back-channel information from the White House. In the early hours of January 6, Watkins posted a tweet accusing Vice President Mike Pence of orchestrating a coup. He also linked to a blog post which called for "the immediate arrest of [Pence], for treason."

On January 8, Twitter suspended accounts that were "solely dedicated to sharing QAnon content", including Watkins'. In addition, the accounts of Sidney Powell and former national security adviser Michael Flynn were also suspended. However, on January 10, 2023, Watkins' account was reinstated following the acquisition of Twitter by Elon Musk.

On January 20, 2021, QAnon followers struggled to reconcile that Joe Biden had been inaugurated with their beliefs that Trump would still become president, or that there would be a "Great Awakening" or "the Storm": a day on which Trump and military allies would gather their political opponents for execution. Watkins appeared to be one of the figures abandoning the theory, posting on Telegram, "We gave it our all. Now we need to keep our chins up and go back to our lives as best we are able." QAnon researcher Travis View warned against believing Watkins, pointing to his past claim that he had quit 8kun to focus on his woodworking only to "[fill] the vacuum of Q by spreading conspiracy theories".

=== Subsequent endeavors ===
Amid the Maricopa county election audit, Watkins falsely alleged that 200,000 Trump votes went uncounted.

In October 2021, Watkins appeared at a conference called For God & Country: Patriot Double Down in Las Vegas, where he called himself a "digital Rosa Parks", comparing his bans from mainstream social media to Parks' bus arrest.

==== Bid for Congress ====
In October 2021, Watkins filed a statement of interest with the Arizona Secretary of State to run for the United States House of Representatives in Arizona's 1st congressional district as a Republican. He officially announced his run for Congress with a video in which he called Democratic incumbent Tom O'Halleran the "dirtiest Democrat in the D.C. swamp".

Watkins campaigned mostly through Telegram; he hired conspiracy theorist podcaster Tony Teora as a campaign manager and associated with a local sovereign citizen activist. In January 2022, he appeared at a school board meeting in Scottsdale, where he accused "communist creeps" in school boards of indoctrinating children with "transsexual propaganda" and critical race theory and of taking away parental rights by "teaching our children that they can be vaccinated without parental consent".

In February 2022, it was reported that Watkins' campaign had raised just above $33,000, some of which was in the form of a loan from his father. Watkins also entered into polemics with Arizona senator Wendy Rogers, whom he accused of botching the Maricopa County election audit. Rogers responded by calling Watkins a "weirdo" and mocking his fundraising efforts. She later said she would enact a "ceasefire" with Watkins.

In the voting, on August 2, 2022, Watkins came in last among 7 candidates to the Republican primary, with less than 4% of the votes.

== Personal life ==
After high school, Watkins moved to China. Watkins lived with his father in Manila in the Philippines in the 2010s. As of January 2021, Watkins was living in Japan; in October 2021 he moved to Arizona. In a 2022 speech he gave at Prescott, Arizona, Watkins mentioned that he had a five-year-old daughter and was divorced.
