= 2channel =

Anonymous Japanese textboard

- Logo in 2012, featuring a spittoon with Giko, Shii, Mona and Moralar, surrounded by popular memes from the site
- Native name: 2ちゃんねる (Japanese)
- Website type: Textboard
- Available in: Japanese
- Owner: Disputed
- Creator: Hiroyuki Nishimura
- Website: 2ch.net (historically)
- Commercial: Yes
- Users: 10 million monthly (2010)
- Launched: 30 May 1999 (27 years ago)
- Current status: Disputed (since 19 February 2014; 12 years ago)

2ch.sc 2ちゃんねる (Note: 2ch.sc calls itself 2ちゃんねる, just as the former 2ch.net did. When it is necessary to differentiate 2ch.net from 2ch.sc in Japanese, the form 2ちゃんねる (2ch.sc) is often used.)
- Available in: Japanese
- Founded: 1 April 2014; 12 years ago
- Owner: Hiroyuki Nishimura
- Parent: Packet Monster Inc.
- Website: 2ch.sc
- Commercial: Yes
- Current status: Active

5channel 5ちゃんねる
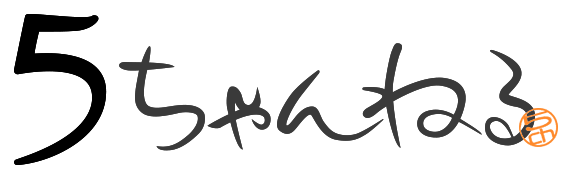
- Available in: Japanese, with a small minority of boards in English
- Founded: 1 October 2017; 9 years ago
- Owner: Jim Watkins
- Parent: Loki Technology Inc. via Race Queen Inc.
- Website: 5ch.io
- Commercial: Yes
- Current status: Active

2channel (Japanese: 2ちゃんねる, Hepburn: ni channeru), also known as 2ch, Channel 2, and sometimes retrospectively as 2ch.net, was an anonymous Japanese textboard (Note: 2channel, and other sites like it, are called keijiban (掲示板) in Japanese. This word literally translates to "bulletin board", but in English, that word only refers to older text-based systems, not web bulletin boards like 2channel. Therefore, the correct translation is "textboard" in English.) founded in 1999 by Hiroyuki Nishimura. Described in 2007 as "Japan's most popular online community", the site had a level of influence comparable to that of traditional mass media such as television, radio, and magazines. At the time, the site drew an annual revenue of around ¥100 million (about US$1 million), and was the largest of its kind in the world, with around ten million visitors and 2.5 million posts made per day.

The site was hosted and had its domain registration provided by Jim Watkins, based in San Francisco, California. In 2009, ownership of the site was transferred to Singapore-based Packet Monster Inc., under which Nishimura remained in control. In February 2014, Watkins seized the 2ch.net domain, taking full control over the website and assuming the role of site administrator. This has resulted in two textboards claiming to be the legitimate 2channel: 2ch.sc, owned by Nishimura through Packet Monster Inc., and 5channel (5ちゃんねる, go channeru; domain originally 5ch.net, now 5ch.io), established in 2017 by redirect from the original domain and owned by Watkins through Philippines-based Loki Technology Inc.

2channel and its successors are more controversial than other social media in Japan; they are extremely popular among Japan's extreme right-wing, known as the netto-uyoku, who post xenophobic comments, often targeting Korean and Chinese people. Defamation is of particular concern; by August 2008, Nishimura had received more than one hundred lawsuits for defamatory comments left on the website. Announcements of crimes also have drawn scrutiny of 2channel and its successors. In 2012, 2channel was accused by the Tokyo Metropolitan Police of allowing its platform to be used by amphetamine dealers, although no charges were filed.

In September 2007, 2channel claimed over 2.4 million posts per day. (Note: These statistics are self-reported.) As of July 2020, 5channel claimed 1,031 boards receiving around 2.7 million posts per day on weekends, with no growth since March 2016. Meanwhile, 2ch.sc claimed 826 boards receiving around 5,700 posts daily.

== History ==
Ayashii World was laid out something like a non-threaded e-mail client without subjects. All messages were sorted chronologically, and to see the post being replied to, a link must be followed.

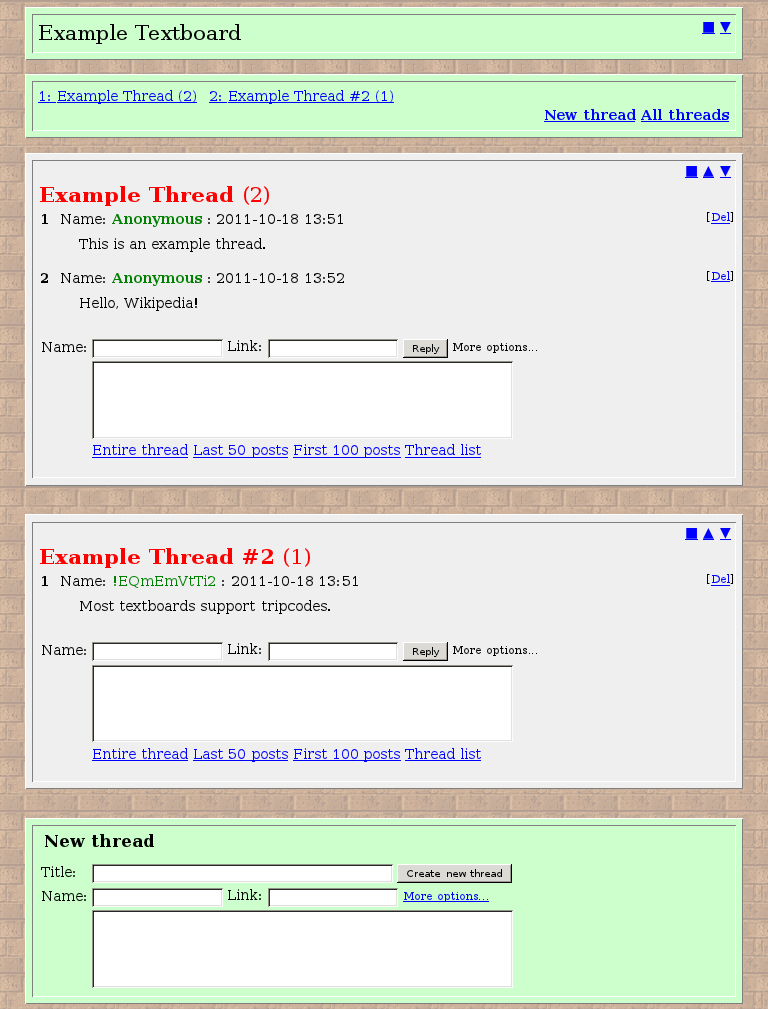
Meanwhile, Amezou and 2channel were laid out in the more familiar textboard format, where threads are ordered by their last post unless the user specifically chooses not to make their post bump the thread.

=== Predecessors ===
Textboards like 2channel were rooted in two earlier technologies: dial-in bulletin boards, known in Japan as grass roots bulletin boards (草の根BBS), and Usenet. 2channel has two predecessors: Ayashii World created in 1996 by Shiba Masayuki, and Amezou (あめぞう), created in 1997. Ayashii World was the first large anonymous web bulletin board in Japan, while Amezou originated the more familiar "textboard" concept wherein threads are displayed chronologically, with new comments bumping old threads to the top, rather than in a branching tree. Ayashii World closed in 1998, leading most of its former users to go to Amezou; Nishimura advertised 2channel in a post on Amezou in May 1999, calling it "Amezou's second channel". From June, Amezou became increasingly unable to handle the load on its servers, until its host shut it down after threats against Amezou's anonymous owner which contained his dox were posted on it.

=== Early history ===
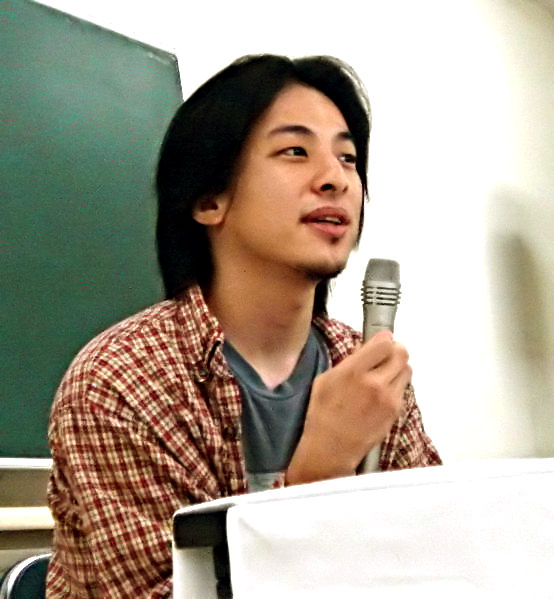
Hiroyuki Nishimura founded 2channel in 1999 while a student in Arkansas.

2channel was founded on May 30, 1999, in a college apartment in Conway, Arkansas on the campus of University of Central Arkansas by Hiroyuki Nishimura. Success came quickly; many of Amezou's users began using it as soon as it opened. When compared with other bulletin boards, 2channel's technology wasn't much different; what led to its success was instead its being an "outlet for unfettered expression"; by being hosted in the United States, 2channel was able to bypass more restrictive Japanese censorship rules, while still being accessible from Japan. The site also enjoyed greater immunity from legal action within Japan due to the location of its servers. By 2002, Google said that the most searched word in Japan was "2channel". By 2004, 2channel was already the largest internet forum in Japan.

The name "2channel" is a reference to VHF channel 2, the default setting for the RF modulators used in earlier-generation game consoles (such as Nintendo's Family Computer) when connecting to Japanese television sets. Where Amezou was originally meant to be "channel one", 2channel was meant to be "channel two". The site's iconic jar logo is a reference to deprecatory remarks some former users of Ayashii World would make about 2channel early on in the site's history, likening it to a spittoon (痰壷). Nishimura took this nickname and adopted it as the site's logo by 2002.

Jim Watkins, an ex-US army non-commissioned officer (sergeant first class), domain name registrar, and dedicated hosting service provider, hosted 2channel since at least 2004 through various corporate identities, including Big-server.com Inc., Pacific Internet Exchange LLC and N. T. Technology Inc. Before 2channel, Watkins' company primarily specialized in using servers and domains in the United States to serve uncensored pornographic content to users in Japan.

=== Ownership transfer and government scrutiny ===
On 2 January 2009, Nishimura claimed to have transferred ownership of 2channel to Packet Monster Inc., a company based in Chinatown, Singapore, and to no longer be involved in the site's management. However, Nishimura was charged with violating Japanese narcotic control laws anyway on 20 December 2012. (Note: The full name of the law, Act No. 94 of 1991, is An Act Concerning Special Provisions for the Narcotics and Psychotropics Control Act, etc. and Other Matters for the Prevention of Activities Encouraging Illicit Conducts and Other Activities Involving Controlled Substances through International Cooperation (国際的な協力の下に規制薬物に係る不正行為を助長する行為等の防止を図るための麻薬及び向精神薬取締法等の特例等に関する法律).) As part of their case, the Tokyo Metropolitan Police Department (MPD) claimed Nishimura remained involved in 2channel's operations, alleging Packet Monster Inc. is a shell company (ペーパーカンパニー). The main thrust of the complaint was that Nishimura allegedly did not delete posts seeking to purchase illicit amphetamine from other 2channel users online; the Internet Hotline Center, an agency of the MPD, alleged that in 2011 97% of its 5,223 deletion requests did not result in deletion. On 19 March 2013, the Public Prosecutors Office decided not to prosecute the case.

In August 2013, the Tokyo Regional Taxation Bureau declared in a tax audit that Nishimura had failed to declare ¥100 million worth of website revenue which should have been taxed between 2009 and 2012, years in which he financially benefited from Packet Monster Inc.; Nishimura settled the matter by paying the owed tax, ¥30 million.

=== Personal information leak ===
In August 2013, a hacker using the name sassy ecchi (さっしーえっち) leaked the personal details (including names, addresses, and phone numbers) and credit card numbers of thousands of 2channel users who had used 2channel's paid services into the public domain, exposing the anonymous profiles of various high level personas such as politicians and writers, including an attorney involved in 2channel cases, Takahiro Karasawa (唐澤貴洋), and a staff member of AKB48. More than 74,000 users had their personal information exposed by the leak.

The paid service involved in the leak was known as the "2channel viewer" (2ちゃんねるビューア), or maru (●). (Note: The service received the nickname maru (lit. circle) because users of it could signal their support of 2channel by attaching a "●" to their post in the name field, which other users could not do.) Its main utility was that it allowed users to read old threads; if a thread on 2channel received 1,000 posts, it would become part of the kako rogu (過去ログ, lit. past log) by a process of ".dat omission" (dat落ち) (Note: 2channel threads were encoded in a quasi-open standard known as ".dat". 5channel's official documentation includes examples.) of such threads, after which time a thread was no longer freely accessible. 2channel charged ¥3,600 per year for the service, which was typically paid by credit card; logs of these payments were the source of the data leak.

At the time of the leak, Watkins apologized on behalf of N. T. Technology, Inc., saying he was the victim of a "cyber attack" and that "some data [of my] customers was compromised."

=== Domain seizure and split ===
On 19 February 2014, Jim Watkins, as chairman of N.T. Technology, Inc., 2channel's domain registrar, seized 2channel's domain. He took full control over the website, relieved Nishimura of all power, and assumed the role of website administrator. Watkins made the kako rogu free to all users shortly after assuming control.

Watkins claimed that Nishimura had failed to pay him money owed which led to the seizure as a way to cover Nishimura's debts, while Nishimura claimed that he had in fact paid everything owed and that the domain transfer was an illegal domain hijacking. In response, Nishimura created his own clone of 2channel at 2ch.sc, scraping the contents of the entire 2channel website and updating 2ch.sc as new posts appeared on 2ch.net. In a Q&A session on 4chan shortly after becoming the site's owner, Nishimura claimed that 2channel was stolen by Watkins.

Nishimura has attempted to repossess the domain both through WIPO's Uniform Domain-Name Dispute-Resolution Policy and through the Japanese court system. Through the Japan Patent Office, Nishimura owns the trademark "2channel", though the WIPO refused to intervene on his behalf on account of that, suggesting the parties go to court instead as it was not, in its view, a case of "cybersquatting" but rather a "business dispute".

Ron Watkins, Jim's son, in 2016 registered the trademark "5channel" in Japan. On 1 October 2017, 2ch.net began redirecting to 5ch.net, a domain owned by Loki Technology, Inc. The chairman of Loki Technology Inc. is also Jim Watkins; his wife, Liziel, is the treasurer and majority shareholder. According to a press release, the name was changed to 5channel to avoid potential legal issues due to Nishimura's ownership of the "2channel" trademark. On March 5, 2026, 5ch.net was permanently suspended by the domain registrar Epik for content related to animal abuse. The website was moved to 5ch.io.

== Culture ==
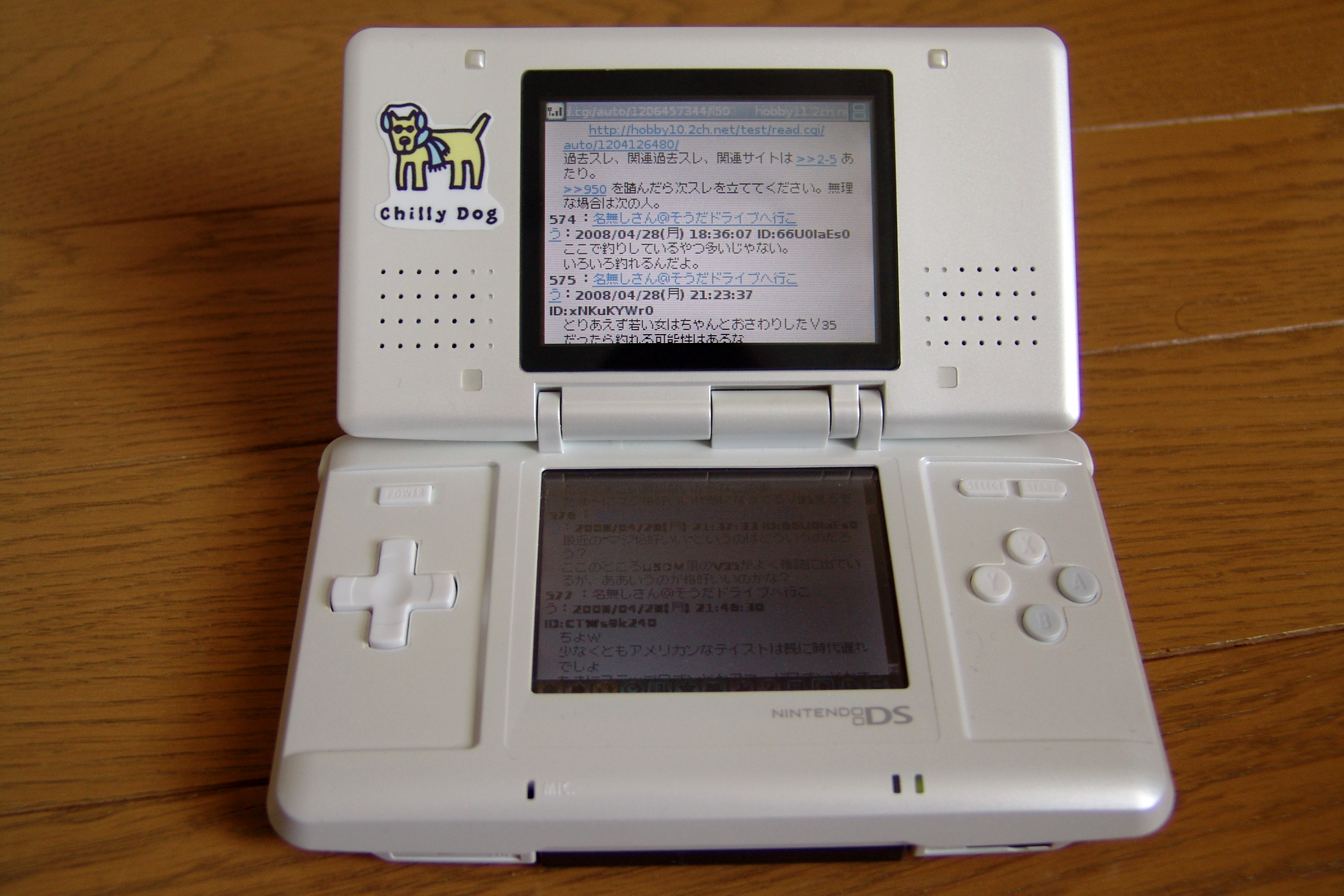
A Nintendo DS browsing a thread on 2channel's automobile board as it appeared in 2008 via the Nintendo DS Browser

Due to its large number of boards, the types of information exchanged on 2channel are very diverse. There are boards for topics as diverse as sports, sex, celebrity gossip, computer programming and ongoing earthquakes; even some academic research has gotten its start on 2channel.

=== Anonymous posting ===
One of the most distinctive features of 2channel is its use of anonymous posting. Nishimura explained his reasons for preferring anonymity online to USC Annenberg's Japan Media Review thus:

If there is a user ID attached to a user, a discussion tends to become a criticizing game. On the other hand, under the anonymous system, even though your opinion/information is criticized, you don't know with whom to be upset. Also with a user ID, those who participate in the site for a long time tend to have authority, and it becomes difficult for a user to disagree with them. Under a perfectly anonymous system, you can say, "it's boring," if it is actually boring. All information is treated equally; only an accurate argument will work.

However, a frequent criticism directed toward anonymous textboards like 2channel, most notably by Kazuhiko Nishi, is that their anonymous nature make them mere "toilet graffiti" (便所の落書き). 2channel's anonymity is a departure from most English language internet forums which require some form of registration, usually coupled with email verification for further identification of an individual; its anonymity in part inspired the creation of 4chan. On 2channel, a name field is available, but it is seldom used. However, as open proxies such as the Tor network are banned from posting on 2channel, the administrators have some degree of ability to help law enforcement unmask users if necessary.

=== Revenue ===
While 2channel and its successors are commercial, 2channel was moderated by volunteers. 2channel relied on advertisements from "obscure" companies. In 2007, it had an annual revenue of around ¥100 million. Between 2009 and 2012, ¥200 million in ad profits were transferred to Nishimura's Singaporean shell company.

As early as 2004, companies such as Dentsu were data mining the website for their clients, keeping them informed of how they were being portrayed by 2channel users; (Note: Gala is a division of Dentsu.) by 2006, 75% of the content Dentsu analyzed on behalf of its customers was posted to 2channel.

2channel also received revenue from subscription services like the aforementioned maru. For its part, 5channel has a subscription service, "Premium Rōnin" (プレミアム浪人), that allows people outside Japan to post on it; this service also hides ads from its subscribers.

==== Matome ====
2channel historically allowed anyone to use its data, providing it in an easily parsable format; this made it simple to create third party "dedicated browsers" (専用ブラウザ, sen'yō burauza) for posting on and using 2channel. The openness of the data allowed for the proliferation of matome saito (まとめサイト, summary websites) and afi burogu (アフィブログ, affiliate blogs), which summarize 2channel threads and attempt to collect what they see as the "best of" 2channel. In 2007, due to growing discontentment towards such sites, Nishimura added a board, /poverty/, (Note: Similar to the boards on the sites it inspired, like 4chan's /pol/, boards on 2channel are, by convention, referred to by the ends of their URLs.) which marked every post on it with the phrase tensai kinshi (転載禁止, transl. reproduction [of this post is] prohibited). This caused many users to abandon other boards for that board.

Watkins made it a priority to combat "piracy" of 5channel by third-party matome sites in March 2014, adding tensai kinshi to many popular boards. Such sites siphon users from 2channel itself, with some receiving in excess of 100 million monthly pageviews; in one case a matome site earned its owner ¥300,000 per month. Watkins followed up the rule change by restricting access to 2channel's data in March 2015, by requiring that dedicated browser authors use a special API to access 2channel's, and later 5channel's, thread data. On 10 July 2023, Jane, a company that provided a 5channel API server, terminated its 5channel API service, thus ending several applications' support for the site. Some browsers, including Jane's, replaced their support for 5channel with another anonymous textboard site named Talk.

=== Phenomena ===
==== Densha Otoko ====
Densha Otoko is a Japanese franchise consisting of a movie, television series, manga, and other media, all based on the purportedly true story of a 23-year-old man who intervened when a drunk man started to harass several women on a train. The man ultimately begins dating one of the women. The event and the man's subsequent dates with the woman, chronicled on 2channel, directly inspired the franchise. Whether or not the original 2channel story is actually true is debated.

==== Shift_JIS art ====
2channel and its successors, being textboards, cannot have images posted to them. Users get around this, however, by posting a more expressive form of ASCII art: Shift_JIS art. (Note: "More expressive", here, is used in the sense that more art is possible with Shift_JIS art than would be possible with ASCII art due to the larger character set of the Shift_JIS encoding.) Below is a small sample:

Gikoneko predated 2channel, yet was used on it as well. It frequently appears with the tagline itte yoshi (逝ってよし, You can die!).

Mona, an early example, appeared first in 2000. Derives its name from its frequent tagline, omae mo na (お前もな or オマエモナー, Look who's talking!).

==== Political activism ====
2channel and other websites with "chan" in their name have been known for activism done by their users for a variety of causes.

== Controversies ==
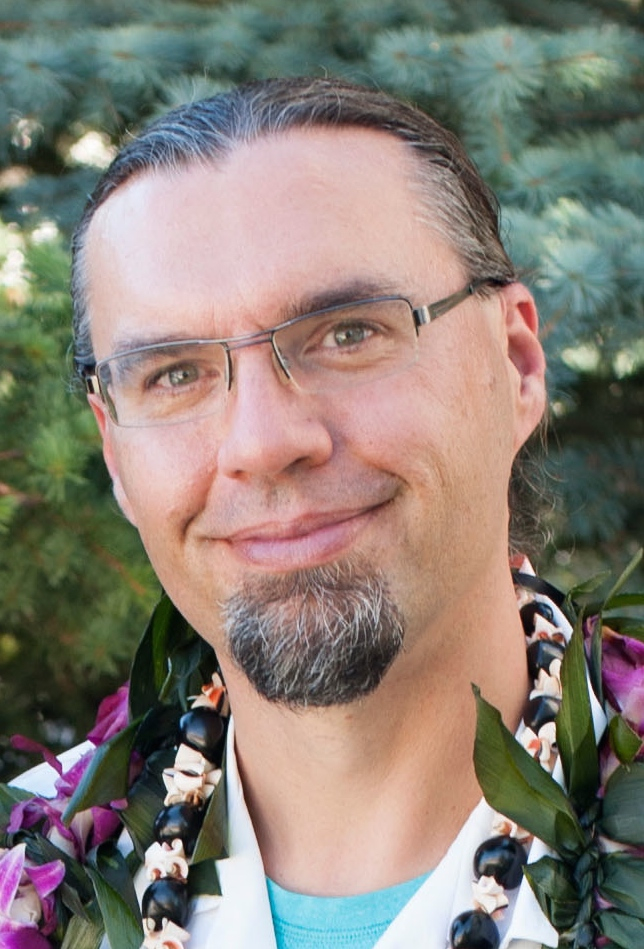
Debito Arudou, above, won a ¥1,100,000 libel judgment against 2channel in 2006 after Nishimura refused to delete posts calling Arudou a white supremacist.

=== Slander and legal issues ===
During Hiroyuki's administration, he was often openly defiant of Japanese law, especially around libel, and his duty to follow it, telling Yomiuri Shimbun in March 2007:

I don't have any intention of paying up to a country whose laws I don't respect. As long as they're not handing me the death sentence, I'm not backing down.

By May 2008, Nishimura had lost more than fifty libel lawsuits in Japanese civil courts, and had been assessed millions of dollars in penalties; by August, according to him, he'd received more than one hundred lawsuits. While according to the official pages of the website, slander was prohibited, activists such as Debito Arudou claimed that the site did not actually respond to requests to delete posts in his case, returning mail unopened. After the transfer to Packet Monster Inc., Arudou, who had still not received any of the court ordered penalty, wrote in an op-ed that Nishimura had only transferred his assets to increase his "unaccountability". While Nishimura at that point had never paid any of the compensation courts ordered in his cases, in 2010 one of his plaintiffs was successful in getting compensated through the publisher of one of Nishimura's books.

=== Crime announcements ===
Crime announcements (犯行予告) were a regular occurrence on 2channel, including of mass suicides and murders. After the 2000 Neomugicha incident, in which a bus was hijacked by a teenager who posted on 2channel, police officers started regularly policing 2channel; such surveillance only increased after a copycat killer referencing the Akihabara massacre announced his 2008 attack on 2channel as well. Former superintendent of the Tokyo Metropolitan Police Tateshi Higuchi called the site a "den of iniquity". According to The Japan Times, however, 2channel cooperated with police in the past to aid them in catching criminals using 2channel by giving police their IP addresses, from which their locations were determined.

Such crime announcements have continued to be a problem on 5channel; it was speculated that the man who carried out the Kyoto Animation arson attack posted an advance warning of the crime on 5channel.

=== Far-right nationalism and anti-Korean hate speech ===
2channel, with its massive size and anonymous posting, is abundant with slander, hate speech and defamation against public figures, institutions, and minority ethnic groups. Far-right users of 2channel are referred to as netto-uyoku, a term roughly analogous to "alt-right". Though the site has rules against posts illegal under Japanese law, the scale and anonymous nature of the site makes prompt deletions difficult to realize in practice. Furthermore, on occasion, 2channel has been accused of being reluctant to remove defamatory posts. The discussion boards are also often used to coordinate real-life demonstrations; as an example, 2channel users organized an August 2011 rally against Fuji Television, their complaint being that the channel was broadcasting too many Korean television shows. Sankei Shimbun reported in 2018 that 5channel, which received most of 2channel's users, has the same reputation for attracting netto-uyoku.

2channel netto-uyoku frequently make racist comments against Koreans. In 2009, it was even discovered that an Asahi Shimbun employee had posted racist remarks towards Koreans on 2channel. After the 2011 Tōhoku earthquake and tsunami, fake news proliferated on 2channel, falsely accusing Chinese and Korean people of "plundering" evacuation centers.

== Technology ==
2channel operated on forum software that was considered innovative at the time of its founding, originally written by Hiroyuki himself, but later replaced through the collective effort of his Unix-savvy users; the software is known as read.cgi. It was a major departure from Usenet; however, when compared to other Japanese textboards at the time, such as Amezou, 2channel's format was not much different.

Boards in the textboard software have their threads sorted by the time of their last post, so making a post would "bump" (上げ, age) the thread to the top of the board index. However, when posting in a thread, users may use a function known as "lowering" (下げ, sage) to avoid bumping a thread in this way. Often, posters will use sage on purpose, to avoid unwanted attention.

=== Major outages ===
==== 2010–2011 Korean DDoS ====
In response to racism towards Koreans by 2channel users, especially against Yuna Kim, an athlete who defeated Japan in the 2010 Vancouver Olympics, the site suffered an extended outage in March 2010 due to a distributed denial of service (DDoS) attack conducted by a Korean hacking group. The attack against Jim Watkins' Pacific Internet Exchange LLC affected other sites on the shared network as well, including some belonging to US government agencies; it is estimated to have cost US$2.5 million. Watkins requested the American government investigate the event as an instance of "cyberterrorism"; according to him, sporadic DDoS attacks by Koreans continued into 2011.

==== 2015 8chan DDoS ====
Beginning on 8 January 2015, 8chan, also owned by Jim Watkins and hosted on the network of N. T. Technology, Inc., suffered an outage due to a DDoS attack. Due to the attack, 2ch.net, then owned by Watkins but not yet operated under the name 5channel, went down as well. The attacks against the messageboards lasted until at least 13 January, leading "many 2channel users to become angry with the management".

== Societal impact ==
The 2channel forum is a Japanese internet phenomenon. This single site has more influence on Japanese popular opinion than the prime minister, the emperor and the traditional media combined. On one level, it serves as a fun, informative place for people to read product reviews, download software and compare everything from the size of their poop to quiz show answers. But conversations hosted here have also influenced stock prices, rallied support for philanthropic causes, organized massive synchronized dance routines, prevented terrorism and driven people to their deathbeds.

— Lisa Katayama, Wired (2008)

In September 2007, 2channel averaged over 2.4 million posts per day. As of July 2020, 5channel had 1,031 boards receiving around 2.7 million posts per day on weekends, with no growth since March 2016. Meanwhile, 2ch.sc then had 826 boards receiving around 5,700 posts daily. Due to its popularity, 2channel and its successors have had considerable influence on Japanese society.

=== Children's use of 2channel ===
Use of sites like 2channel by minors is a major concern in Japan. Some children's search sites, such as the now-defunct Kids Goo (キッズgoo), filtered textboards like 2channel. In Tokyo, a local ordinance requires that internet service providers develop filters to prevent minors from accessing sites which could harm the "sound and wholesome fostering [of their youth]"; they must also confirm before installing a connection if any minors live in the household.

Despite this, however, web filter provider Net Star in February 2007 released the results of a survey which showed that the utilization rate of 2channel for primary and secondary students was 12.2%. In response to threads on 2channel about certain schools which were leading to cyberbullying, the Ministry of Education in 2008 released a 65-page manual for teachers and parents on how to handle the issue. Concerned about the popularity of 2channel among children and teenagers, a team of childhood education professors at the University of the Ryukyus in 2009 published a paper making recommendations to lawmakers on how to curb such use.

In February 2020, Nishimura himself wrote an op-ed in Nikkan Kogyo Shimbun warning parents about the dangers of allowing their children unfettered access to social media sites like YouTube and 2channel.

=== Politicians and 2channel ===
Naoto Kan, a future prime minister who was then a member of the National Diet, sent a legal notice on 10 May 2000 demanding that 2channel delete a post by someone falsely claiming to be him.

After the Liberal Democratic Party presidential election in 2007, Prime Minister Tarō Asō stated in a Fuji TV interview that he sometimes posts on 2channel. During each election season, supporting posts for perennial candidates Matayoshi Jesus and Mac Akasaka were frequently made on 2channel, turning them into something of a meme, similar to the repeated candidacies of Vermin Supreme in the United States. After more than ten failed candidacies for various political offices, including Governor of Tokyo, Akasaka was eventually elected to the Tokyo Metropolitan Assembly, representing Minato, in April 2019. Asahi Shimbun credited Akasaka's online fame with helping him win the surprise victory.

=== 2channel in the media ===
Japanese news organizations often relied on 2channel to determine the issues the public was thinking about, and for leads. However, the mass media often reports on it negatively, similar to how it reported on otaku culture a decade ago, before it went more mainstream, even though internet trends nowadays routinely slip through into other media. The phrase "the online bulletin board says" (インターネットの掲示板で), when used in reporting, may refer either to 2channel or to other forums. Movements spawned on 2channel often receive media attention, noting how the methods of 2channel activists break socially normative behavior and bring pressure to bear through sheer numbers. Beyond this, though, 2channel posts were often a basis for media reports in Japan.

TV programs have even featured 2channel's moderators and users; comedian Hikari Ōta, for example, criticized Nishimura during a discussion on the Tokyo Broadcasting System's Sandējapon on the ideal limits of free expression as applied to social networks.

Shokun! magazine, during its operation, ran a column known as Kōjimachi Denmō Sokkōjo (麹町電網測候所, lit. Kōjimachi internet weather station) which shared "patriotic" 2channel posts. Weekly Bunshun, published by Bungeishunjū), meanwhile, has been criticized for being seen as overly pro-2channel and relying on its posts too much in its reporting.

== See also ==
- Futaba Channel (2chan)
- Ilbe Storehouse, South Korea
- Shift JIS art
- Tianya Club, China
