= 8chan =

Imageboard website

8kun
- Website type: Imageboard
- Available in: English (users can create language-specific boards)
- Owners: Jim Watkins (2016–present); Fredrick Brennan (2013–2016)
- Creator: Fredrick Brennan
- Advertising: Yes
- Commercial: Yes
- Registration: Optional
- Launched: October 22, 2013 (13 years ago)
- Current status: Active

8kun, previously called 8chan, Infinitechan or Infinitychan (stylized as ∞chan), is an imageboard website composed of user-created message boards. An owner moderates each board, with minimal interaction from site administration. The site has been linked to white supremacism, neo-Nazism, the alt-right, racism, antisemitism, hate crimes, and multiple mass shootings. The site has been known to host child pornography; as a result, it was filtered out from Google Search in 2015. Several of the site's boards played an active role in the Gamergate harassment campaign, encouraging Gamergate affiliates to frequent 8chan after 4chan banned the topic. 8chan is the origin and main center of activity of the discredited QAnon conspiracy theory.

Shortly before the 2019 El Paso shooting, a four-page message justifying the attack was posted to the site, and police have stated that they are "reasonably confident" it was posted by the perpetrator. In the aftermath of the back-to-back mass shootings on August 3 in El Paso and August 4 in Dayton, Ohio, respectively, the site was taken off clearnet on August 5, 2019, when network infrastructure provider Cloudflare stopped providing their content delivery network (CDN) service. Voxility, a web services company that had been renting servers to Epik, the site's new domain registrar, as well as Epik's CDN provider subsidiary BitMitigate, also terminated service. After several attempts to return to clearnet were ultimately stymied by providers denying service to 8chan, the site returned to clearnet as 8kun in November 2019 through a Russian hosting provider.

== History ==
Former 8chan logo

8chan was created in October 2013 by computer programmer Fredrick Brennan. Brennan created the website after observing what he perceived to be rapidly escalating surveillance and a loss of free speech on the Internet. Brennan, who considered the imageboard 4chan to have grown into authoritarianism, described 8chan as a "free-speech-friendly" alternative, and originally conceptualized the site while experiencing a psychedelic mushrooms trip.

No experience or programming knowledge is necessary for users to create their own boards. Since as early as March 2014, its FAQ has stated only one rule that is to be globally enforced: "Do not post, request, or link to any content illegal in the United States of America. Do not create boards with the sole purpose of posting or spreading such content." Brennan claimed that, while he found some of the content posted by users to be "reprehensible", he felt personally obligated to uphold the site's integrity by tolerating discussion he did not necessarily support regardless of his moral stance.

Brennan agreed to partner 8chan with the Japanese message board 2chan, and subsequently relocated to the Philippines in October 2014.

In January 2015, the site changed its domain after multiple people filed reports complaining to 8chan's registrar that the message board hosted child pornography. Despite subsequently regaining the original domain, the site remained at the new domain with the old domain redirecting to it.

Numerous bugs in the Infinity software led to the funding and development of a successor platform dubbed "Infinity Next". After a several-month-long testing period, a migration to the new software was attempted in December 2015, but failed. In January 2016, development was halted, and the main developer, Joshua Moon, was fired by Brennan. Brennan himself officially resigned in July 2016, turning the site over to its owner, Jim Watkins and his son, Ron Watkins. He cited the failure of the "Infinity Next" project and disillusionment with what 8chan had become as reasons.

=== August 2019 removal from clearnet ===
Following the three shootings in 2019 (Christchurch, New Zealand, in March; Poway, California, in April; El Paso, Texas, in August) in which the perpetrators of each used 8chan as a platform to spread their manifesto, there was increased pressure on those providing 8chan's Internet services to terminate their support.

Matthew Prince, CEO of Cloudflare, initially defended his firm's technological support of 8chan on August 3, 2019, the day of the El Paso shooting: "What happened in El Paso today is abhorrent in every possible way, and it's ugly, and I hate that there's any association between us and that ... For us the question is which is the worse evil?"

However, by the next day, August 4, with increasing press attention, Cloudflare changed its position, and rescinded its support for 8chan effective midnight August 5 Pacific Time, potentially leaving the site open for denial of service attacks. Prince stated: "Unfortunately the action we take today won't fix hate online ... It will almost certainly not even remove 8chan from the Internet. But it is the right thing to do." Prince wrote on the Cloudflare Blog:

8chan is among the more than 19 million Internet properties that use Cloudflare's service. We just sent notice that we are terminating 8chan as a customer effective at midnight tonight Pacific Time. The rationale is simple: they have proven themselves to be lawless and that lawlessness has caused multiple tragic deaths. Even if 8chan may not have violated the letter of the law in refusing to moderate their hate-filled community, they have created an environment that revels in violating its spirit.

Brennan, the creator of 8chan, ceased being the owner of the platform in 2015 and stopped working for the website in 2018. He stated on August 4, 2019, that 8chan should be shut down, and subsequently thanked Cloudflare for its decision to pull support for 8chan.

Tucows also terminated its support as 8chan's domain name registrar, making the site difficult to access. In the wake of Cloudflare and Tucows' changes, 8chan switched its domain register to BitMitigate, a division of Epik, a provider that had previously serviced far-right sites like Gab and The Daily Stormer. After 8chan moved to Epik, the company's CEO Rob Monster wrote: "Freedom of speech and expression are fundamental rights in a free society. We enter into a slippery slope when we start to limit speech that makes us uncomfortable." However, Voxility, the company that provided BitMitigate and Epik with its own servers and Internet connectivity, then took steps to stop leasing servers to BitMitigate, taking that site offline, and stated that the intended use of their servers violated their acceptable use policy. Monster changed his decision to provide content hosting to 8chan soon after the company's removal from Voxility, citing concerns that 8chan did not have the ability to adequately moderate content. However, Ars Technica noted that the company had begun providing 8chan with DNS services.

Although the website was unreachable through its usual domain on clearnet, users continued to access the site through its IP address and via its .onion address on the Tor hidden services darknet. Security researcher and terrorism analyst Rita Katz noted that a site claiming to be 8chan had also appeared on ZeroNet, another darkweb network, although an 8chan administrator tweeted that their team was not the one running the site.

On August 6, 2019, the United States House Committee on Homeland Security called 8chan's owner, Jim Watkins, an American living in the Philippines, to testify about the website's efforts to tackle "the proliferation of extremist content, including white supremacist content". On August 11, 2019, Watkins uploaded a YouTube video saying that 8chan had been offline "voluntarily", and that it would go back online after he spoke with the Homeland Security Committee. In early September, Watkins traveled to Washington, D.C. for congressional questioning. In an interview with The Washington Post, Watkins said that 8chan staff were building protections against cyberattacks to replace Cloudflare's services, and that the website could come back online as early as mid-September.

=== Rebrand to 8kun and return to clearnet ===
On October 7, 2019, 8chan's official Twitter account and Jim Watkins' YouTube channel released a video that unveiled a new "8kun" logo. In it, a snake (which resembles that of the Gadsden flag) forms a shape of number 8 on top of the logo. The "8chan" name was based on the '-chan' suffix (shortened from 'channel') used by the imageboards that employ the 2channel-like format, but it was suggested that the new name is a wordplay based on Japanese honorifics; in that case, '-chan' can be interpreted as the one generally used for young children, especially females, while '-kun' suffix is used for younger males in general, or sometimes subordinates in the workplace. On October 9, 2019, 8chan's official Twitter account posted a notification that instructed board owners who wish to migrate to 8kun to send their "shared secrets" (a tool that enables board owner to recover an 8chan board) to an email address at 8kun.net.

Brennan has vocally opposed 8chan's relaunch as 8kun, claiming the effort will not change the reputation previously associated with 8chan, and also citing his troubled relationship with 8chan administrators. Brennan has also suggested that the success of 8kun will depend on the return of "Q" and its followers. The new 8kun domain was registered with Tucows on September 7, 2019, but a spokesperson from Tucows stated that the company was unaware of the situation until the news about 8kun broke out, and that it was looking into the matter. 8kun was set to launch by October 17, 2019, however the attempt failed as British server provider Zare discontinued support. A spokesperson for Zare claimed in a statement to Vice that the team behind 8kun may have provided false details while registering themselves. On October 22, Watkins packed 8chan's servers into a van and transported them to an unknown location. This was later revealed to be in preparation for a move to the network VanwaTech, owned by Nicholas Lim, the founder of BitMitigate. On November 5, 8chan came briefly back online as 8kun by using a bogon IP through Media Land LLC. Media Land LLC is owned by the Russian Alexander "Yalishanda" Volosovyk, who has been described as the "world's biggest 'bulletproof' hosting operator" and is known for enabling cybercriminal activity. 8kun's trouble getting back online continued in the subsequent weeks, with Ron Watkins telling The Wall Street Journal "8chan is on indefinite hiatus" on November 16. 8kun moved to a .top domain on November 16, after the Tucows domain registrar stopped providing services earlier in the month. CNServers, which indirectly provided DDoS protection to VanwaTech via Spartan Host, cut ties in October 2020, taking 8kun briefly offline as a result. VanwaTech subsequently moved to DDoS-Guard, a Russian-owned service provider registered in Scotland.

=== Usage in planning the storming of the U.S. Capitol ===
8kun, which is one of the primary platforms used by followers of QAnon and those on the far-right, was used by rioters to plan the January 6, 2021 storming of the United States Capitol. Some posts on the message board discussed which politicians the posters would kill once they entered the building, and some suggested killing police, security guards, and federal employees.

After receiving questions from The Guardian following the attack, the cyberattack protection company DDoS-Guard terminated its service to 8kun's hosting provider, VanwaTech. Speaking to The Guardian, one of DDoS-Guard's owners explained that the company had been providing their services to VanwaTech, not to 8kun directly, but that they "were not related to any political issues and don't want to be associated in any sense with customers hosting such toxic sites like QAnon/8chan". Cyberattack protection services were restored to 8kun when VanwaTech began using the American company FiberHub.

On August 27, 2021, the U.S. House of Representatives select committee investigating the storming of the Capitol demanded records from 8kun (alongside 14 other social media companies) going back to the spring of 2020.

== Controversies ==
Numerous controversies related to content posted on 8chan have arisen, to the extent that participation by individuals or companies in the website can itself cause controversy. On February 25, 2019, THQ Nordic hosted an AMA (ask me anything) thread on the video games board of the website, /v/, for which it later apologized.

=== Gamergate ===
On September 18, 2014, 8chan became entangled in the Gamergate harassment campaign after 4chan banned discussion of Gamergate, whereupon 8chan became one of several hubs for Gamergate activity. The site was little-known prior to the controversy. 8chan's initial Gamergate-oriented board "/gg/" also gained attention after being compromised by members of the internet troll group Gay Nigger Association of America, forcing Gamergate activists to migrate to "/gamergate/". This replacement quickly became the site's second-most accessed board.

=== Swatting incidents and violent threats ===
In January 2015, the site was used as a base for swatting exploits in Portland, Seattle, and Burnaby, British Columbia, most of them tied to the victims' criticism of Gamergate and 8chan's association with it; the attacks were coordinated on a board on the website called "/baphomet/". One of the victims of a swatting attack said that she was singled out because she had followed someone on Twitter. On February 9, 2015, content on the "/baphomet/" subboard was wiped after personal information of Katherine Forrest, the presiding judge in the Silk Road case, had been posted there.

In 2019, a post threatening a mass shooting against Bethel Park High School was posted on 8chan; as a result, an 18-year-old individual was arrested and charged with one count of terroristic threats and one count of retaliation against a witness or victim.

=== Child pornography ===
Boards have been created to discuss topics such as child rape. While the sharing of illegal content is against site rules, The Daily Dot wrote that boards do exist to share sexualized images of minors in provocative poses, and that some users of those boards do post links to explicit child pornography hosted elsewhere. When asked whether such boards were an inevitable result of free speech, Brennan responded: "Unfortunately, yes. I don't support the content on the boards you mentioned, but it is simply the cost of free speech and being the only active site to not impose more 'laws' than those that were passed in Washington, D.C."

In August 2015, 8chan was blacklisted from Google Search for what Google described as content constituting "suspected child abuse content".

=== Donald Trump presidential campaign ===
In July 2016, U.S. presidential candidate Donald Trump tweeted an image of Hillary Clinton with a background of money and a six-pointed star which resembled the Star of David, containing the message "Most corrupt candidate ever". The image had been posted to 8chan's /pol/ board as early as June 22, over a week before Trump's team tweeted it. A watermark on the image led to a Twitter account which had published many other overtly racist and antisemitic images.

=== QAnon ===
8chan is the home of the discredited far-right QAnon conspiracy theory.

In October 2017, a 4chan user that referred to himself as "Q" started gaining attention by promoting conspiracy theories about the deep state. The next month, citing security concerns, Q moved to 8chan and only posted there from then on, eventually leading to an international movement. Sean Hannity has retweeted QAnon hashtags on his Twitter feed. On March 14, 2018, the initial group of Q followers on Reddit were banned over their promotion of the theory. They quickly regrouped into a new subreddit, which featured posts from Q and other anonymous posters on 8chan in a more reader-friendly format. The subreddit was banned for a second time on September 12, 2018. With a flood of new users on the board, Q asked one of the website's owners, Ron Watkins, to upgrade the website's servers in order to accommodate all of the board's website traffic on September 19, 2018.

The movement has been linked with the Pizzagate conspiracy theory. The Q movement has also been linked to the hashtags #TheGreatAwakening and #WWG1WGA, which stands for "where we go one, we go all"; it is also sometimes linked with the phrase "Follow the White Rabbit".

=== Louisiana Police's antifa list ===
In September 2018, the Louisiana State Police were scrutinized for using a hoax list of personal information about supposed antifa activists originally posted on 8chan's politics board. The document, dubbed "full list of antifa.docx" by police officers, actually contained the names of several thousand people who signed online petitions against then President Donald Trump. The State Police has refused to disclose the list, claiming it would "compromise" ongoing criminal investigations in which it expects arrests. A lawsuit against Louisiana State Police was filed on behalf of the record requester by Harvard lecturer and former public defender Thomas Frampton, alleging that the Police's refusal to release the list indicates that it actually believed the credibility of the hoax list and used it in investigations and litigations.

=== 2019 shootings ===
The perpetrators of three mass shootings, all in 2019, each used 8chan to spread their manifesto. As a result, there was increased pressure on those providing 8chan's Internet services to terminate their support, which led to the services companies' withdrawal from providing CDN and domain registry, taking the website off clearnet.

==== Christchurch mosque shootings ====
Prior to attacks on two mosques in Christchurch, New Zealand, on March 15, 2019, the perpetrator, Brenton Harrison Tarrant, posted links to what was ultimately a 17-minute Facebook Live video of the first attack on Al Noor Mosque and his white nationalist, neo-fascist manifesto The Great Replacement (named after the French far-right conspiracy theory of the same name by writer Renaud Camus) detailing his anti-Islamic and anti-immigration motivations for the attack. The shootings overall left 51 dead and 40 more injured. Some members of 8chan re-shared it and applauded the attacks.

On March 20, 2019, Australian telecom companies Telstra, Optus, and Vodafone blocked the websites 4chan, 8chan, Zero Hedge, and LiveLeak as a reaction to the Christchurch mosque shootings. In New Zealand, the main ISPs, Spark, One NZ, and 2degrees, followed suit in blocking 8chan and other websites hosting footage of the shooting.

==== Poway synagogue shooting ====
John T. Earnest, the perpetrator of a shooting at a synagogue in Poway, California, on April 27, 2019, and an earlier arson attack at a mosque in nearby Escondido on March 25, had posted links to his open letter and his attempted livestream on 8chan, which Earnest also named as a place of radicalization for him. According to 8chan's Twitter, the shooter's post was removed nine minutes after its creation.

==== El Paso shooting ====
Patrick Crusius, the suspect in a mass shooting at a Walmart store in El Paso, Texas, on August 3, 2019, allegedly posted a four-page white nationalist manifesto The Inconvenient Truth on 8chan less than an hour before the shooting began. 8chan moderators quickly removed the original post, though users continued to circulate links to this manifesto.

== See also ==
- DLive
- Gab (social network)
- Minds (social network)
- Parler
- Voat
- 4chan
