= Textboard =

Type of Internet forum

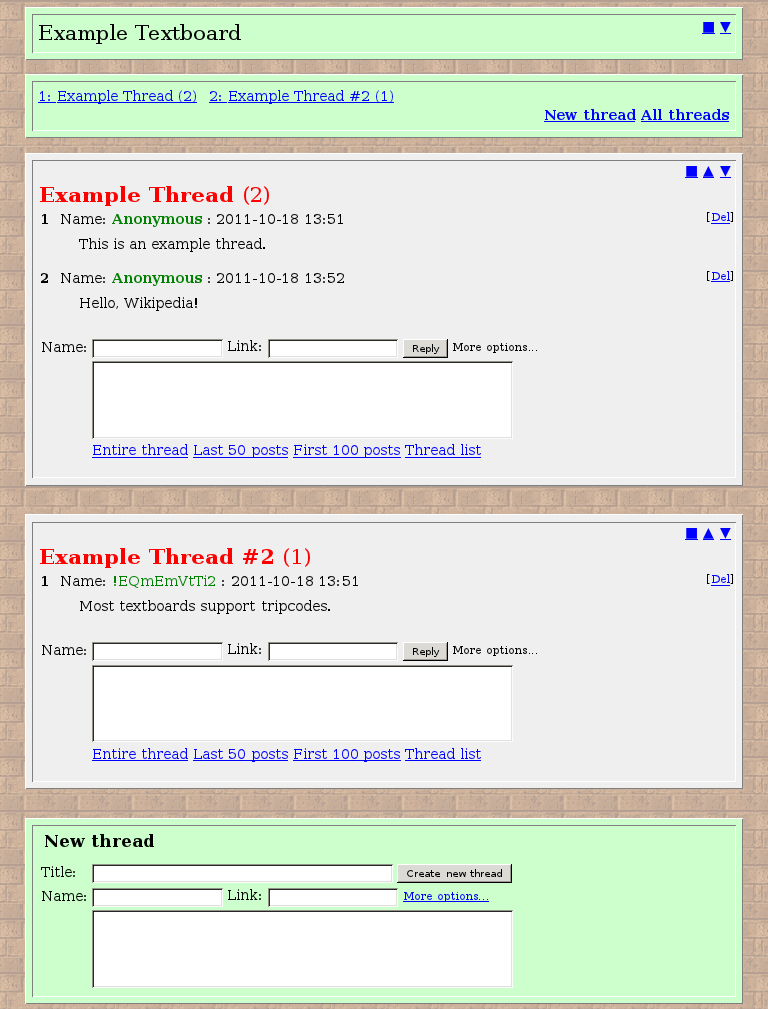
A screenshot of the Kareha software

A textboard is a simple kind of Internet forum; most textboards require neither registration nor entry of a screen name. Textboards, like imageboards, were invented in Japan, but they remain relatively unknown outside it, in contrast to imageboards (such as 4chan and 8chan).

== Features ==
One of the key differences between textboards and traditional forums is that textboards allow users to post without registration, and often encourage anonymous discussion. Hiroyuki Nishimura, the founder of 2channel, says that the philosophy behind anonymous posting is that "all information is treated equally; only an accurate argument will work". Many textboards support a form of pseudo-registration by allowing users to use tripcodes, although users tend to post anonymously.

Textboards tend to be much simpler than traditional forums. While forum software such as phpBB or vBulletin supports image or other media embedding, private messaging, polls, and various other features, textboards allow only the posting of text.

== Notable textboards ==
- Ayashii World (あやしいわーるど) – introduced anonymous posting to Japan.
- 2channel – largest forum in Japan, receiving millions of posts a day.
- world2ch.net - the first English speaking textboard. Launched in March 2003, closed in May 2004 and reopened in November 2022.
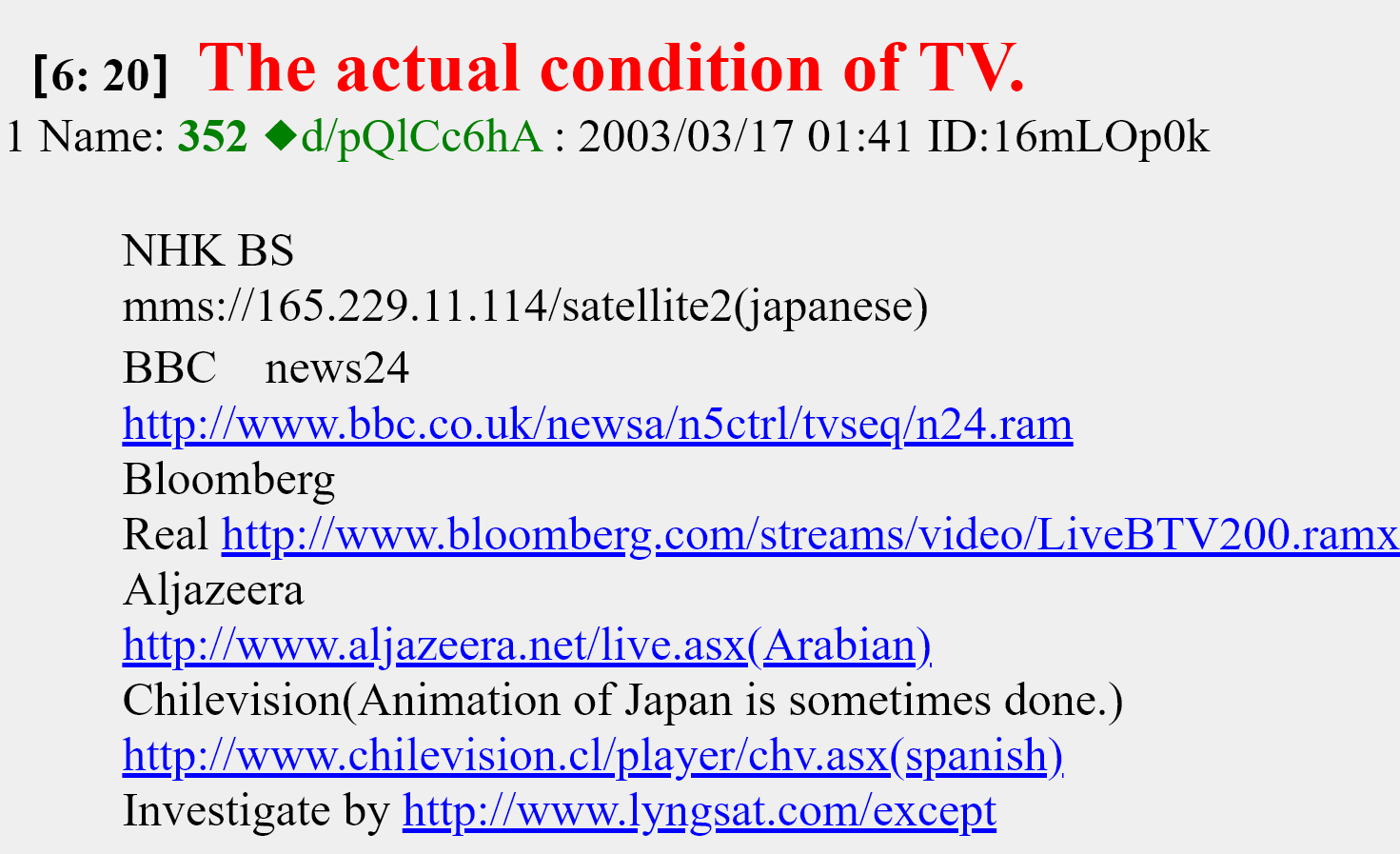
  Likely the first thread on world2ch.net

== Textboard software ==
- Perfect Dark is a Japanese peer-to-peer file sharing (P2P) application that contains textboards.

== See also ==
- Bulletin board system
- Imageboard
- 2channel
- Internet forum
