= Hiroyuki Nishimura =

Japanese internet entrepreneur (born 1976)

- 西村 博之 (Japanese)
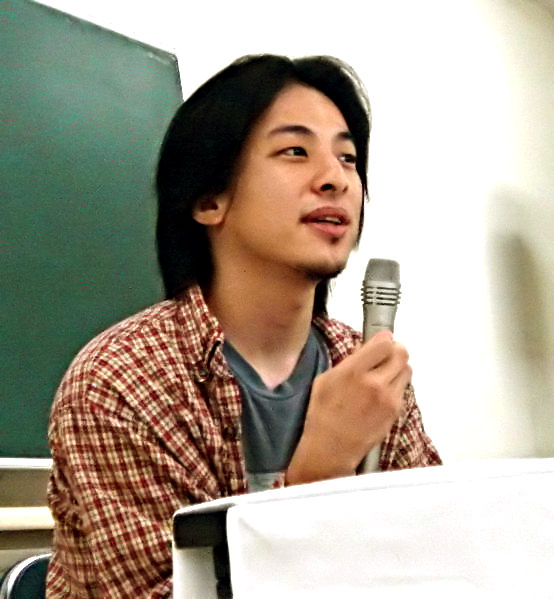
- Nishimura in 2005
- Born: 16 November 1976 (age 49); Sagamihara, Kanagawa, Japan
- Other name: hiroyuki (ひろゆき)
- Occupations: Webmaster; author
- Known for: Founding 2channel; Owning 4chan since 2015

Hiroyuki Nishimura (西村 博之, Nishimura Hiroyuki; born 16 November 1976) is a Japanese internet entrepreneur. He founded the message board 2channel, and is the owner of 4chan. He is also a self-help author and TV personality. He is often known by his given name, hiroyuki (ひろゆき), which he uses, rendered intentionally in lowercase, (Note: Or in hiragana, in Japanese) both as a pen name and as a username.

Until February 2013, he was a director of, and advisor to, Niwango, operator of the video-sharing service niconico.

Christopher Poole, the founder of 4chan, formally announced on 21 September 2015, that he had sold the website to Nishimura. After a dispute with 2channel's hosting provider, Nishimura no longer administrates 2channel, but instead operates a competitor to it, 2ch.sc.

== Career ==
Nishimura was born in Sagamihara, Kanagawa, but raised in Tokyo. (Note: From the "about the author" section of the description of the book on Rakuten: 1976年神奈川県相模原市生まれ。2000年中央大学文学部卒業。[Born in Sagamihara, Kanagawa Prefecture in 1976. Graduated with a degree from the Faculty of Letters of Chuo University in 2000.]) He founded Tokyo Access LP in 1998. (Note: From the "about the author" section of the description of the book on Amazon.co.jp: 1998年、中央大学在学中に合資会社東京アクセスを設立。[In 1998, while enrolled at Chuo University, he established the limited partnership Tokyo Access.]) In May 1999, he opened 2channel while he was studying at the University of Central Arkansas. In June 2001, he founded Irregulars and Partners KK with Ichirō Yamamoto, which was involved in 2channel's management, but later left.

He graduated with a degree in psychology from Chuo University in 2000.

In January 2007, Nishimura was an advisor to Skip-Up KK, CEO of Tokyo Plus KK, co-founder of Future Search Brazil (未来検索ブラジル) KK, and a director of Niwango, the company that launched Nico Nico Douga. He left his role at Niwango in February 2013.

In March 2026, Nishimura alongside Gackt, Hideaki Anno and Dwango founder Nobuo Kawakami were appointed as company directors of POPOPO, a social media app which uses metaverse video calls and was promoted as the “last social media service made by humans before the AI era.”

=== 2channel ===
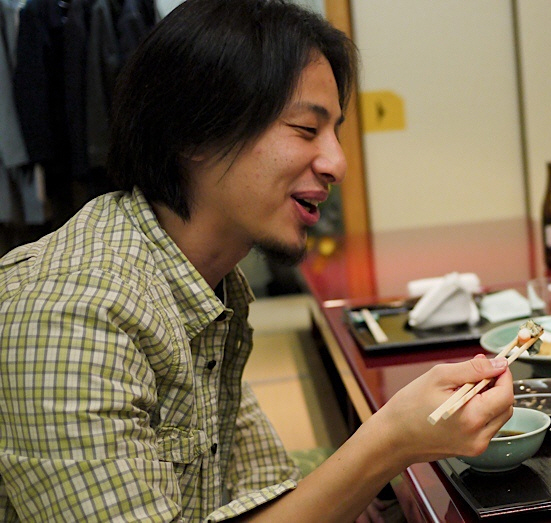
Nishimura in 2011

During 2008, 2ch generated an annual revenue upwards of ¥100 million for Nishimura. The site was also run by 300 "volunteer administrators" who received no pay. Nishimura justified this with the comment, "I don't think that's all that different from some dude who opens a convenience store in front of a train station. They can make a million yen a day."

In August 2013, an accidental leak placed the credit card details of thousands of 2channel users into the public domain, and this event resulted in a series of lawsuits against the website. Around the same time, the anti-matome movement took place throughout 2channel, a controversial community development involving users protesting against "matome blogs" (まとめブログ) which specialize in summarizing 2channel threads, which were taking away site traffic.

On 19 February 2014, Jim Watkins, as chairman of N.T. Technology, Inc., 2channel's domain registrar, seized 2channel's domain. He took full control over the website, relieved Nishimura of all power, and assumed the role of website administrator. Watkins claimed that Nishimura had failed to pay him money owed which led to the seizure as a way to cover Nishimura's debts, while Nishimura claimed that he had in fact paid everything owed and that the domain transfer was an illegal domain hijacking. In response, Nishimura created his own clone of 2channel at 2ch.sc, scraping the contents of the entire 2channel website and updating 2ch.sc as new posts appeared on 2ch.net. In a Q&A session on 4chan shortly after becoming the site's owner, Nishimura claimed that 2channel was stolen by Watkins.

In October 2017, Watkins renamed 2channel to 5channel and transferred it to Loki Technology Inc. to avoid legal complications.

=== 4chan ===
On 21 September 2015, he bought the website 4chan from Christopher Poole. The amount paid has not been disclosed, but The New York Times has reported that the sale was made possible with funds provided by three Japanese investors.

Users on 4chan refer to him commonly as 'hiro' but also by the ethnic slur "gook moot", or the nickname "Jackie 4chan", "Hiroshima Nagasaki," or simply "hiroshimoot".

== Lawsuits ==
=== As defendant ===
Nishimura has lost a number of libel lawsuits which have led to him being assessed a considerable amount in penalties. In 2008, he told Wired he has no intention of paying, saying, "If the verdict mandates deleting things, I'll do it," but, "I just haven't complied with demands to pay money. Would a cell phone carrier feel responsible when somebody receives a threatening phone call?"

=== As plaintiff ===
Nishimura has filed a number of lawsuits against Jim Watkins in connection with his allegation that 2channel was illegally seized. He has attempted to repossess the domain both through WIPO's Uniform Domain-Name Dispute-Resolution Policy and through the Japanese court system. Through the Japan Patent Office, Nishimura owns the trademark "2channel", though the WIPO refused to intervene on his behalf on account of that, suggesting the parties go to court instead as it was not, in its view, a case of "cybersquatting" but rather a "business dispute".

== Personal life ==
Nishimura is married. As of May 2019, he lives in Paris, to which he moved in 2015.

== Bibliography ==
- hiroyuki [ひろゆき] (29 June 2007). 2ちゃんねるはなぜ潰れないのか: 巨大掲示板管理人のインターネット裏入門 [Why 2channel can't be crushed: an introduction to the internet from the administrator of the large textboard]. Tokyo: 扶桑社 [Fusōsha KK]. ISBN 978-4-594-05388-8. OCLC 675467798.
- hiroyuki [ひろゆき] (29 May 2009). 僕が2ちゃんねるを捨てた理由 [Why I left 2channel]. Tokyo: 扶桑社 [Fusōsha KK]. ISBN 978-4-594-05952-1. OCLC 395003142.
- hiroyuki [ひろゆき] (12 October 2018). 論破力 [How to win arguments] (in Japanese). Osaka: 朝日新聞出版 (Asahi Shimbun Publications KK). ISBN 978-4-02-273791-5. OCLC 1061209057.
- hiroyuki [ひろゆき] (21 February 2019). このままだと、日本に未来はないよね。 [If things remain as they are, Japan has no future.] (in Japanese). Tokyo: Yōsensha KK [洋泉社]. ISBN 978-4-8003-1649-3. OCLC 1088409566.
- hiroyuki [ひろゆき] (6 March 2019). お金の話 [Discourses on money] (in Japanese). Tokyo: Kōyōkan KK [興陽館]. ISBN 978-4-87723-237-5. OCLC 1089128536.
- hiroyuki [ひろゆき] (6 April 2019). 自分は自分、バカはバカ。他人に振り回されない一人勝ちメンタル術 [You are yourself, stupid people are themselves. Avoid undue influence, a winner-takes-all technique] (in Japanese). Tokyo: SB Creative. ISBN 978-4-7973-9860-1. OCLC 1102790704.
