= Imageboard =

Type of Internet forum

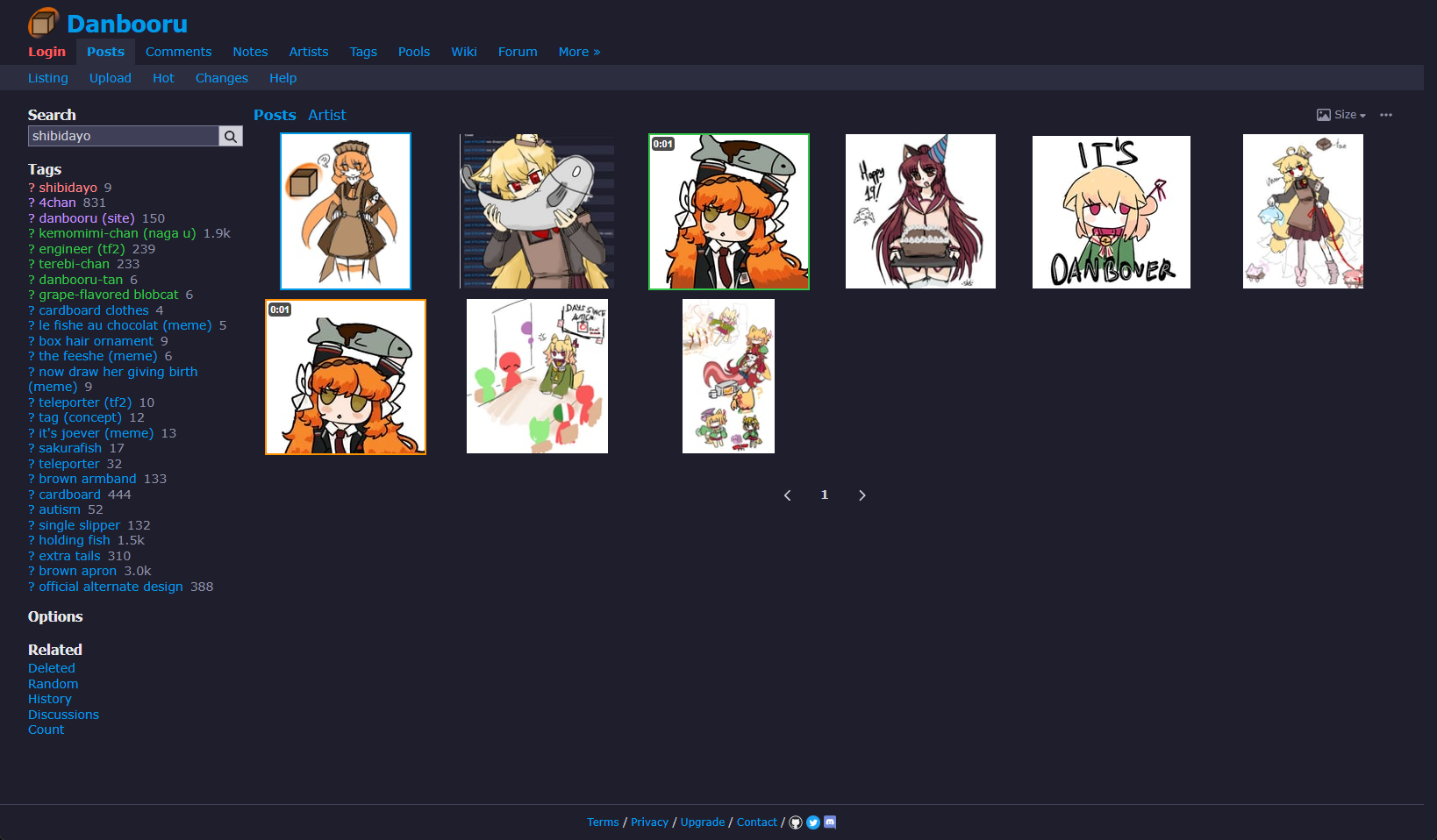
A screenshot of search results from Danbooru, a popular imageboard

An imageboard is a type of Internet forum that focuses on the posting of images, often alongside text and discussion. The first imageboards were created in Japan as an extension of the textboard concept. These sites later inspired the creation of a number of English-language imageboards.

== Characteristics ==
Imageboards, similar to bulletin board systems, are used for discussions of a variety of topics. The primary focus of imageboards, however, is directed away from text posts, and is instead placed on picture posts. The two share many of the same structures, including separate forums for separate topics, as well as similar audiences. Imageboards are much more transitory with content—on some boards (especially highly trafficked ones), the thread deletion time can be as little as 10 minutes. The most popular English language imageboard, 4chan, similarly has a large variety of topics.

Imageboards are also different from online galleries in that most of the works posted are not made by the poster, but instead are taken from other online sources, such as galleries, other imageboards, and edited pictures.

=== Tripcodes ===
A diagram of a typical tripcode derivation process

Most imageboards and 2channel-style discussion boards allow (and encourage) anonymous posting and use a system of tripcodes instead of registration. A tripcode is the hashed (one-way encrypted) result of a password that allows one's identity to be recognized without storing data about users. Entering a particular password will let one "sign" one's posts with the tripcode generated from that password. Trying to take another user's tripcode and compute their password from it (for instance, to make posts that appear to come from a particular person) is somewhat computationally difficult. For those who want a custom tripcode, however, there are custom tripcode generators (which are technically tripcode crackers) available, such as Meriken's Tripcode Engine and MTY_CL. Anonymity is considered to be one of the advantages of an imageboard, and some boards have from time to time removed the ability to post with a name altogether (known as "forced anonymity").

==== Secure tripcodes ====
Because tripcodes can be cracked given enough time, some imageboards, such as 4chan and 8chan, implement a "secure" tripcode. A secure tripcode is not reproducible across different imageboards; it works by prepending a secure salt to the tripcode which, barring security hacker intrusion, is known only to the server's staff. It therefore functions closer to a username than to a cryptographic signature; this is why QAnon could not verify themselves on another website when 8chan went down in late 2019.

== Booru ==
A booru is a type of imageboard designed primarily for hosting and categorizing large collections of images, typically fan art, anime, manga, or other niche media. The term booru comes from the Japanese word "board" (ボード, bōdo), re-pronounced in a way that mimics how early anime/manga fans would romanize it online. It is also a nod to Danbooru (Japanese for cardboard), the original and most well-known booru site.

Boorus were created as a companion to image boards to archive and index posted media, as opposed to the policy of imageboards of deleting them when a post becomes too old. Booru also help international users to find media hosted by non-English gallery host, or hosts which often lack English tags, in particular Pixiv.

=== Forks and community Boorus ===
The source code for Danbooru is publicly available on GitHub. The most popular fork of Danbooru is e621.net, who maintain their own custom feature sets and allowed post types. Some fandoms use their own booru software, such as Derpibooru, the largest and most popular imageboard for My Little Pony fan art.

== List of imageboards ==
=== 1500chan ===
1500chan is a Brazilian online imageboard that was founded on April 13th of 2013, with the largest boards being /b/ and /ufc/. As of 2026, it is the most active imageboard in the country.

=== 2ch ===
Dvach (Russian: двач, romanized: dvách) is a Russian imageboard that replaced the 2ch.ru imageboard (originally known as dvach), which was shut down earlier on 17 January 2009. It thoroughly copied the original layout, was heavily advertised over the internet, and managed to succeed the original one in popularity. According to its owners, the number of posts left in the /b/ board exceeded 150 million. In September 2016, a pro-Russian government organisation, Mail.ru, helped to organize a "defense" against alleged DDOS attacks that took place during the same month. These events raised concerns and speculations among users, who grew suspicious of an alleged takeover committed by Mail.ru, and who criticized the owner's controversial decision to accept "help". As of October 2018 it was widely believed that the imageboard was simply "sold" on undisclosed terms to a pro-government organization. The decision was met with strong criticism, due to the risks to disclosure of users' credentials from an inherently anonymous community, coming from a government body that could potentially violate these principles of anonymity, causing many to leave the board by the end of 2016. As of 2019, it remains one of the largest active Russian-speaking imageboards.

=== 420chan ===
An English-language imageboard based on cannabis culture which was created on 20 April 2005 by Aubrey Cottle. The name is a reference to the larger 4chan and the code term 420 of the cannabis subculture. Its boards included various drug-specific boards, as well as a board featuring a chatbot named Netjester.

=== 4chan ===
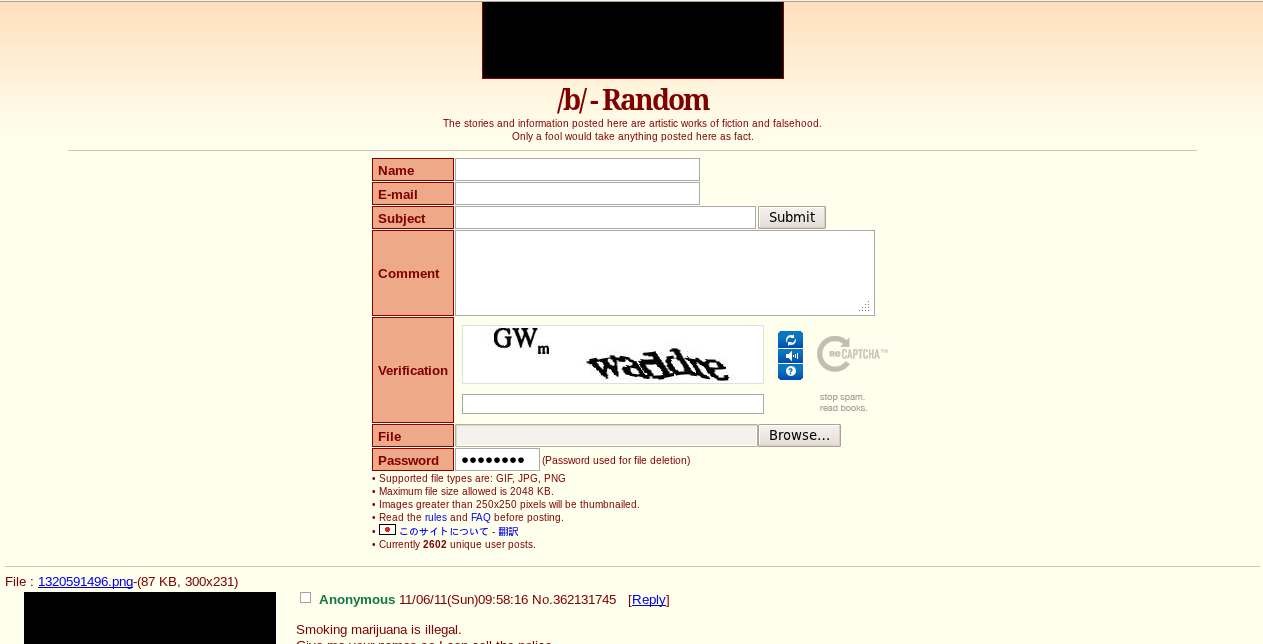
A thread on 4chan, a popular English language imageboard (copyright elements censored)

4chan is an English-language imageboard based on the Japanese imageboard Futaba Channel. This imageboard is based primarily upon the posting of pictures (generally related to a wide variety of topics, from video games and popular culture to politics and sports) and their discussion. The Guardian describes it as "at once brilliant, ridiculous and alarming."

The site and its userbase have received attention from the media for a number of reasons, including attacks against Hal Turner on his Internet shows, distributed denial-of-service attacks against eBaum's World, taking part in Project Chanology, and multiple cases of anti-animal abuse reports. Many Internet memes have originated there, including lolcats, rickrolling, and Pedobear.

=== 8kun ===
8kun (formerly 8chan, or Infinitechan) is a primarily English-language imageboard, although it has sub-boards dedicated to other languages. Just like 4chan, 8kun is based on posting pictures and discussion anonymously, but unlike 4chan, 8kun lets its users decide what they want to discuss by allowing any user to create their own board dedicated to any topic, a concept first made popular by news bulletin boards like Reddit. 8kun also claims to have a strong dedication to freedom of speech and allows all content—so long as the discussion and board creation abides by United States law. However, local moderators enforce the rules of their own boards and may delete posts as they see fit. It is currently partnered with the Japanese textboard 2channel.

=== Endchan ===
Endchan is an English-language imageboard where users can create boards dedicated to any topic. It displays the message 'This is the End.' The site grew popularity in 2019 after 8chan was shut down. Some of the sites' popular boards include /qanonresearch/ (QAnon Research), /qrb/ (Q Research Bunker), and /pol/. Its /pol/ board in particular is described as 'eclectic' compared to similar boards, partly due to the site's relative obscurity. The perpetrator of the 2019 Bærum murder and mosque attack announced the attack on the website. Administrators deleted the thread immediately, and the site's primary web domain was taken offline following the attack.

=== Futaba Channel ===
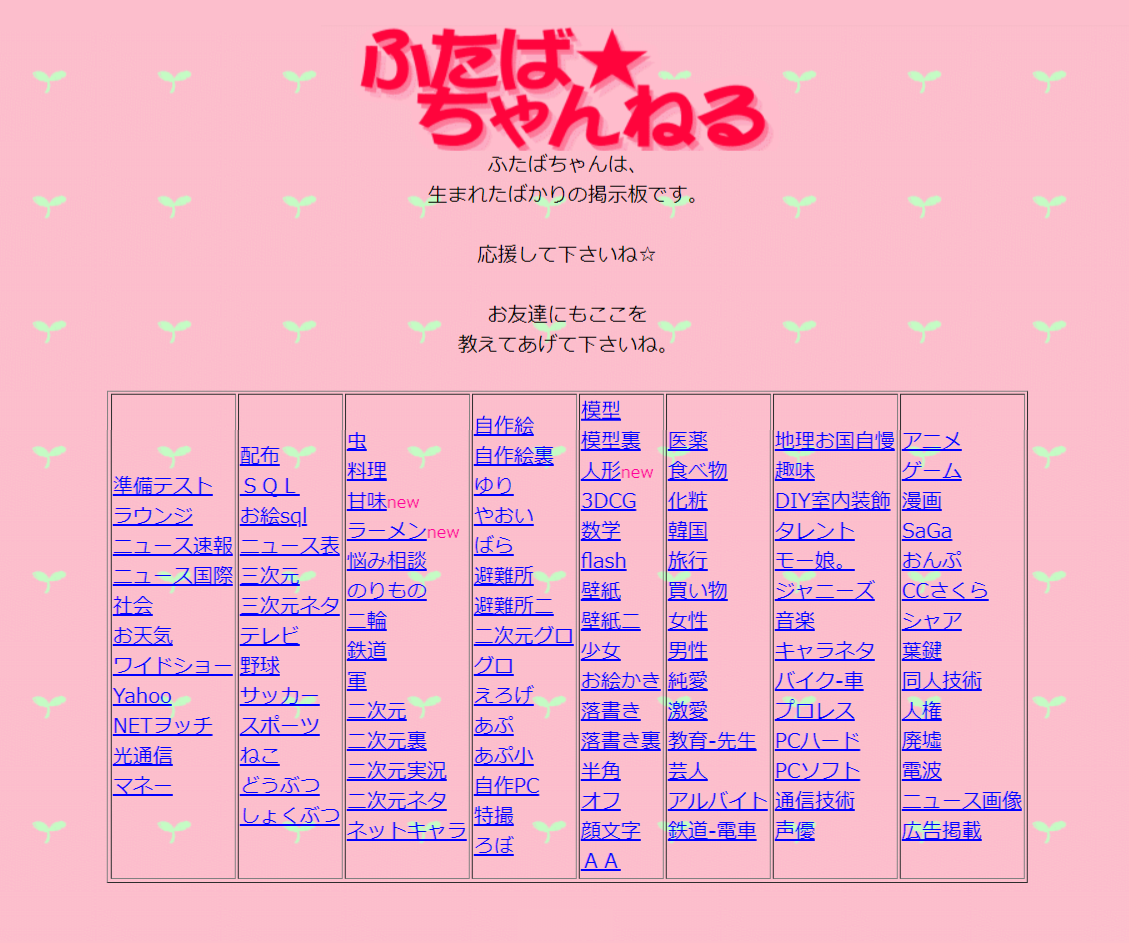
Futaba Channel (2chan)

Futaba Channel (Japanese: ふたば☆ちゃんねる), known as 2chan for short, is an anonymous BBS and imageboard system based in Japan. Its boards usually do not distinguish between not safe for work and clean content, but there is a strict barrier between two-dimensional (drawn) and three-dimensional (computer graphics (CG) and photographic) pictures that is heavily enforced and debated.

=== Hispachan ===
Hispachan was an anonymous imageboard launched in November 2012. Running on a slightly modified version of Kusaba X, it was a global imageboard for all Hispanophones. Vice Magazine described it as "a site for completely anonymous Spanish-language discussion that has proven popular among hackers since its launch in 2012." In January 2017, a school shooting in Monterrey, Mexico was previously announced on Hispachan. In a June 2019 article, Elena Rue of Vice Spain described various Hispachan threads as constituting "collaborative misogyny" for allowing the dissemination of intimate images of women without their permission and online harassment of those objecting to their photos being shared. Despite online complaints by some women, the website is legal and, according to the administrator, "collaborates with the authorities as required by law." In May 2022, Hispachan officially announced its closure on Twitter; it was temporarily available for a few days until all of its content was permanently deleted.

=== Indiachan ===
Indiachan was an anonymous Indian imageboard inspired by 4chan and 8chan. It was created in 2016 and shut down in 2024. It was known for hosting hate speech, including Islamophobia, casteism, and misogyny. The primary languages used were English and Hinglish. Bharatchan emerged as its successor, which continues the imageboard for Indian users.

=== Karachan ===
Karachan is the largest Polish imageboard at 30 million posts, founded in 2010, after its predecessors founded in the period between 2005 and 2010 (Tentacle-chan, Eris-chan, Vichan and then Tapchan, respectively) had shut down. Karachan has received attention from the Polish media after many trolling actions targeting Polish politicians, journalists and the Pope John Paul II (offensive, iconoclastic memes called Cenzopapa; cenzopapa in Wiktionary). As of July 2019, the site consists of a (Polish-language) faux page claiming the site is "blocked" due to "invalid content". However, a manual is known to exist, informing how to enter the actual forum and browse its contents. Its name comes from the Polish word karaczan, which means cockroach, an insect that is used as Karachan's logo.

=== Krautchan ===
Krautchan was a mainly German-language imageboard, founded in 2007. The name is an allusion to the ethnophaulism Kraut for Germans. Unlike most imageboards, postings on Krautchan were not published under the generic name "Anonymous"; the German name "Bernd" was used instead, and the Krautchan community identified themselves as "Bernds" instead of "Anons". In 2009, after the Winnenden school shooting, the interior minister of Baden-Württemberg cited a post on the imageboard in a press conference that appeared to forewarn of the shooting, but was later found to be fake. Like most imageboards, it had /a/, /b/, /jp/, /x/ and /tv/ boards; it ran on the Desuchan board software.

=== Ponychan ===
Founded in February 2011 following the temporary ban of pony content on 4chan, Ponychan was one of the earliest dedicated imageboards for the brony fandom. The rapid growth of pony-related content on 4chan, which increased from 200 to 6000 posts per day between October 2010 and February 2011, and the persistent backlash and resentment from non-brony 4chan users, contributed to the need for a dedicated space. Ponychan was created by former 4chan users seeking a space where they could freely discuss My Little Pony: Friendship Is Magic without 4chan's restrictions. Ponychan shut down in January 2024.

=== Soyjak.party ===
Soyjak.party’s logo

Soyjak.party, also known as "the sharty", is an imageboard website primarily dedicated to the creation and posting of soyjak memes and images, with the most popular boards being /soy/, dedicated to Soyjaks, and /qa/, dedicated to question and answer. The website has multiple yearly events, with "Brimstone Winter" being the most popular, where they try to create more original soyjaks.

The Anti-Defamation League (ADL) describes it as a "far-right reactionary imageboard filled with crude racist and antisemitic humor". The website was created in 2020 by pseudonymous 4chan user Soot, who later said that they intended the forum to be a joke, and did not expect it to become such a popular gathering place.

According to the Global Project Against Hate and Extremism, the perpetrator of the 2025 Antioch High School shooting made references to the website in the manifesto he wrote before carrying out the attack. In their analysis, the ADL stated the shooter cited the site as an inspiration.

The site has also been linked to the 2025 4chan hack, where a user from the imageboard hacked into the website, reopening the /qa/ board, and leaking 4chan's source code, IP addresses, and email addresses of its staff. 4chan went offline after the hack, but has since come back online. The /qa/ board was then permanently deleted. In April 2025, The New Yorker stated that "a spinoff forum called Soyjak.party (even harsher and more political than its predecessor) took credit for hacking the site and shutting it down".

=== Wizardchan ===
Wizardchan was an imageboard primarily dedicated to male culture and topics including anime, hobbies, and depression. Users on the depression board often discussed suicide or self-harm, and a controversy emerged in the board's community about whether to refer users to suicide prevention hotlines. Wizardchan was one of the first sites involved in Gamergate following their harassment of Zoe Quinn. It shut down in 2023.

== See also ==
- Anonymous (hacker group) – Decentralized hacktivist collective
- Reddit – American social news and discussion site
- Textboard – Type of Internet forum
