= Liz Crokin =

American writer and columnist (born 1977)

- Born: Elizabeth M. Crokin; February 8, 1979 (age 47)
- Education: University of Iowa (BA)
- Occupation: Columnist
- Website: lizcrokin.com

Elizabeth M. Crokin (born February 8, 1979) is an American columnist and conspiracy theorist. Since 2017, she has been an outspoken supporter of QAnon conspiracy theories.

== Early life and education ==
Crokin was born on February 8, 1979. She grew up in Glenview, Illinois, and graduated from New Trier High School. She attended the University of Iowa studying political science and journalism. While there, she was an organizer for Students for Bush, an organization supporting the George W. Bush 2000 presidential campaign. She later interned at the U.S. State Department during Bush's first term and for conservative pundit Bill O'Reilly's show The O'Reilly Factor on Fox News.

== Career ==
Crokin began working in 2002 for the Chicago Tribune, before moving to their RedEye daily tabloid writing a column called "Liz in the Loop" (previously "Eye Contact") which covered celebrity news in the Chicago area. In 2010, Crokin moved to Los Angeles and began working as a freelance entertainment reporter for National Enquirer, Star, In Touch Weekly, US Weekly where she focused on celebrity breakups. Crokin returned to Chicago in 2012 to work for lifestyle magazine Splash, a Chicago Sun-Times publication at the time, writing a column called "LA LA Liz".

In September 2012, Crokin developed a viral form of meningitis which progressed into meningoencephalitis and caused daily migraines, vertigo, and photophobia resulting from brain damage. Her health problems resulted in a loss of work, including being laid off in 2013 by American Media Inc., parent company of Star and National Enquirer. Crokin and others had previously accused AMI content officer Dylan Howard of sexual harassment, and has suggested that the layoffs were done in retaliation. Crokin's column in Splash ended in February 2014.

In 2015, Crokin resumed her career as a columnist by writing for Townhall. Though her columns for that magazine focused mostly on sex crimes, in 2016 she published a paper titled Trump Does the Unthinkable, which listed good deeds attributed to then-presidential candidate Donald Trump. That column became very popular on social media among Trump supporters.

Also in 2015, Crokin self-published a semi-autobiographical novel, Malice. The book contained a thinly veiled portrayal of her relationship with a man whom she sued for allegedly exposing her to herpes. Crokin's ex-boyfriend countersued her for his fictionalized portrayal in the novel. The matter was partially settled in 2018.

== Conspiracy theories ==
Crokin first became an adherent of the Pizzagate conspiracy theory after the release of emails from White House official John Podesta. Crokin continues to believe Pizzagate is true, as of 2020. She then became a follower of QAnon, another conspiracy theory whose wider scope includes claims that liberals and elites are running worldwide child sex-trafficking rings whom Donald Trump is secretly fighting. The QAnon source making "intel drops" on imageboards 4chan and 8chan, Crokin believed, was Trump himself or Stephen Miller. According to Crokin, she "immediately knew [QAnon] was legit" upon discovering the first "drop". She went on to become one of QAnon's most prominent "influencers".

Crokin shares the QAnon beliefs that the Mueller investigation was a cover for a pedophile investigation and that the cabal of child abusers will ultimately be defeated and its members arrested en masse in an event known as "the Storm". In 2017, future congresswoman Marjorie Taylor Greene credited Crokin for her discovering QAnon. At the end of December 2017, Crokin claimed on Twitter that photographs posted on Snapchat by Chrissy Teigen, which showed the model with her one-year-old daughter, contained concealed messages suggesting Teigen was connected to Pizzagate. After Twitter removed her verification, Crokin went on to contend that Teigen might be under the CIA's Project MKUltra mind control program (long since scrapped). Other people possibly under MKUltra, according to Crokin, include Harvey Weinstein and Jeff Bezos. She featured in Out of Shadows, a documentary uploaded to YouTube in April 2020. For her, Jeffrey Epstein and the NXIVM scandal demonstrated the continuing validity of Pizzagate.

Crokin was the original source for Roseanne Barr's deleted tweet in March 2018 claiming President Donald Trump had released hundreds of children from bondage each month. Crokin had used fake figures in a 2017 blog post for the conservative Townhall website entitled "Why the MSM Is Ignoring Trump's Sex Trafficking Busts" claiming a "staggering 1,500-plus arrests" of involved individuals in the first 30 days of Trump's presidency. Another thesis she has spread is that John F. Kennedy Jr. did not die in a 1999 plane crash, but faked his death, and is behind QAnon. According to Right Wing Watch, she predicted in March 2018 that the conspiracy theories suggesting "thousands of high-level political, business and entertainment figures are involved in cannibalistic satanic pedophilia" would be proven as true before President Trump leaves office.

In February 2019, Crokin expressed disappointment that Trump had not yet conducted the "mass arrests" of the child sex ring members as promised by Q, and worried that Trump might lose support if he waited too long. She added that she was in favor of citizen's arrests against John Podesta and other people, and warned that people might lose patience and take the street to conduct "vigilante justice".

During the early months of the COVID-19 pandemic, she relayed the #FilmYourHospital hashtag, as an attempt to prove that the pandemic was a "lie" engineered by the "cabal" and China.

Crokin was eventually banned by all mainstream social media platforms for her misinformation campaigns. Her ban from Twitter was lifted on January 6, 2023.

On December 6, 2022, Crokin appeared at a fundraising event hosted by former US President Donald Trump at his house Mar-a-Lago in Florida.
