= QAnon =

American conspiracy theory and political movement

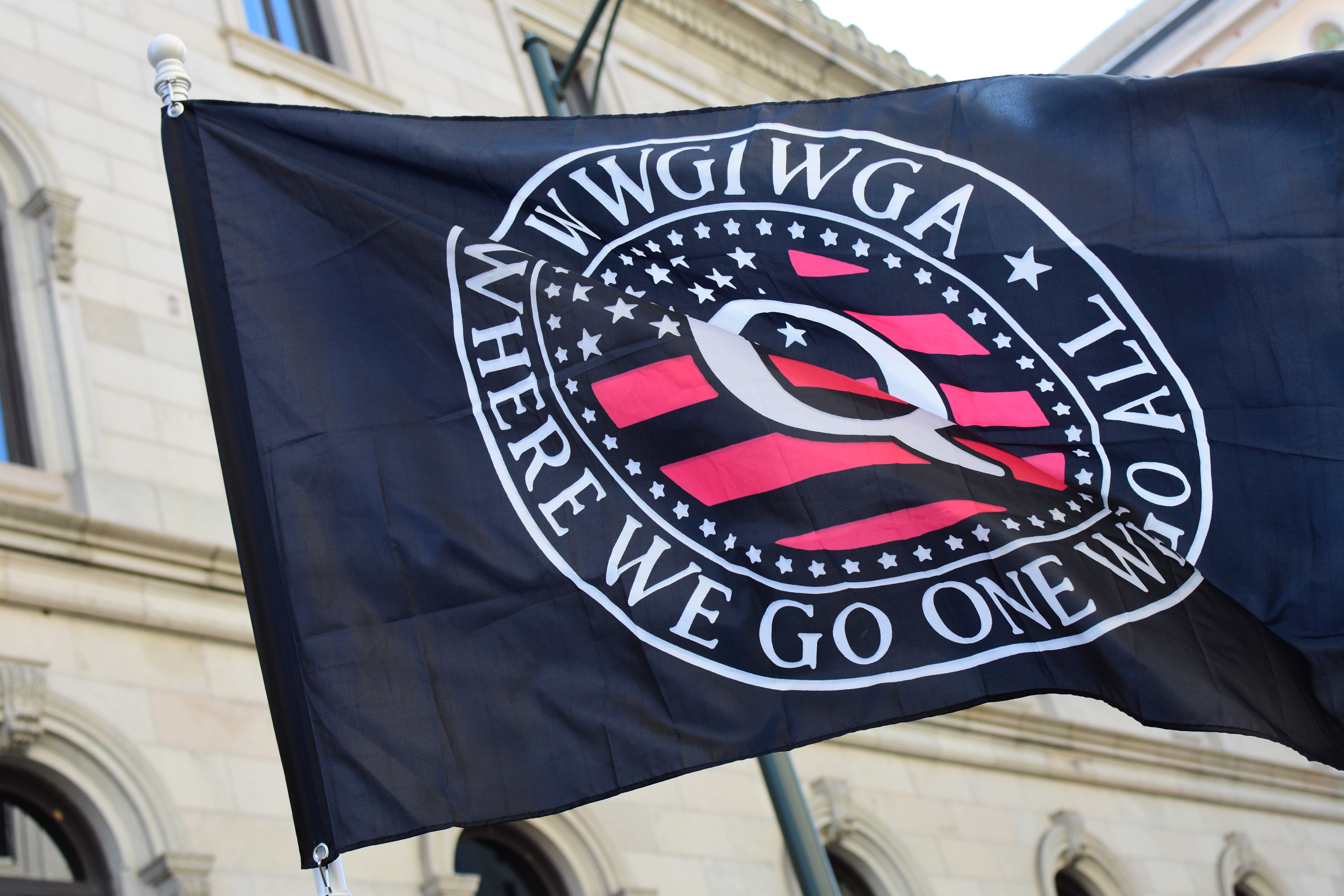
QAnon flag featuring an American flag overlaid with the Q logo alongside the slogan "Where we go one, we go all", at a Second Amendment rally in Richmond, 2020

QAnon (Note: The term originally referred to the anonymous poster "Q", but the media soon used the compound "QAnon" as a collective term for either the conspiracy theory or the far-right community driving and discussing it.) (Note: Pronounced /ˈkjuːəˌnɒn/ KEW-ə-NON.) is a far-right American political conspiracy myth and political movement that originated in 2017. QAnon centers on the fabrications of an anonymous individual or individuals known as "Q Clearance Patriot", more commonly known as "Q". Q's claims have been relayed and developed by online communities and influencers. Their core belief is that a cabal of Satanic, cannibalistic child molesters in league with the deep state is operating a global child sex trafficking ring and that Donald Trump is secretly leading the fight against them. (Note: Multiple sources:) QAnon has direct roots in Pizzagate, another conspiracy theory that appeared on the Internet one year earlier, but also incorporates elements of many different conspiracy theories and unifies them into a larger interconnected theory. QAnon has been described as a cult.

During the first presidency of Donald Trump, QAnon followers believed the administration would conduct arrests and executions of thousands of members of the cabal on a day known as "the Storm" or "the Event". QAnon conspiracy believers have named Democratic politicians, Hollywood actors, high-ranking government officials, business tycoons, and medical experts as members of the cabal of pedophiles. QAnon is described as antisemitic or rooted in antisemitic tropes, due to its fixation on Jewish financier George Soros and conspiracy theories about the Rothschild family, a frequent target of antisemites.

Though QAnon has its origins in older conspiracy theories, it was set in motion in October 2017 when Q first posted on the website 4chan. Q claimed to be a high-level government official with Q clearance, with access to classified information about the Trump administration and its opponents. Q soon moved to 8chan, making it QAnon's online home. Q's often cryptic posts, which became known as "drops", were collected by aggregator apps and websites and relayed by influencers. QAnon became a viral phenomenon beyond the internet and turned into a political movement. QAnon followers began to appear at Trump campaign rallies in August 2018, and Trump amplified QAnon accounts on Twitter. QAnon's conspiracy theories have also been relayed by Russian and Chinese state-backed media, social media troll accounts, (Note: Multiple sources:) and the far-right Falun Gong-associated Epoch Media Group. (Note: Multiple sources:)

Following its emergence in American politics, QAnon spawned movements around the world. The exact number of QAnon adherents is unclear. After increased scrutiny of the movement, social media platforms such as Twitter and Facebook began taking action to stop the spread of the conspiracy theory. QAnon followers have perpetrated acts of violence. Members of the movement took part in the 2020 United States presidential election, during which they supported Trump's campaign and waged information warfare to influence voters. After Joe Biden won, they were involved in efforts to overturn the results of the election. Associates of Trump, such as Michael Flynn, (Note: Multiple sources:) Lin Wood (Note: Multiple sources:) and Sidney Powell, (Note: Multiple sources:) have promoted QAnon-derived conspiracy theories. When these tactics failed, Trump supporters – many of them QAnon followers – attacked the U.S. Capitol on January 6, 2021. The Capitol attack led to a further, more sustained social media crackdown on the movement and its claims. Though the QAnon movement in its original form lost traction after the 2020 election, some of the concepts it promoted went on to permeate mainstream American political discourse.

== Background ==
=== Pizzagate ===
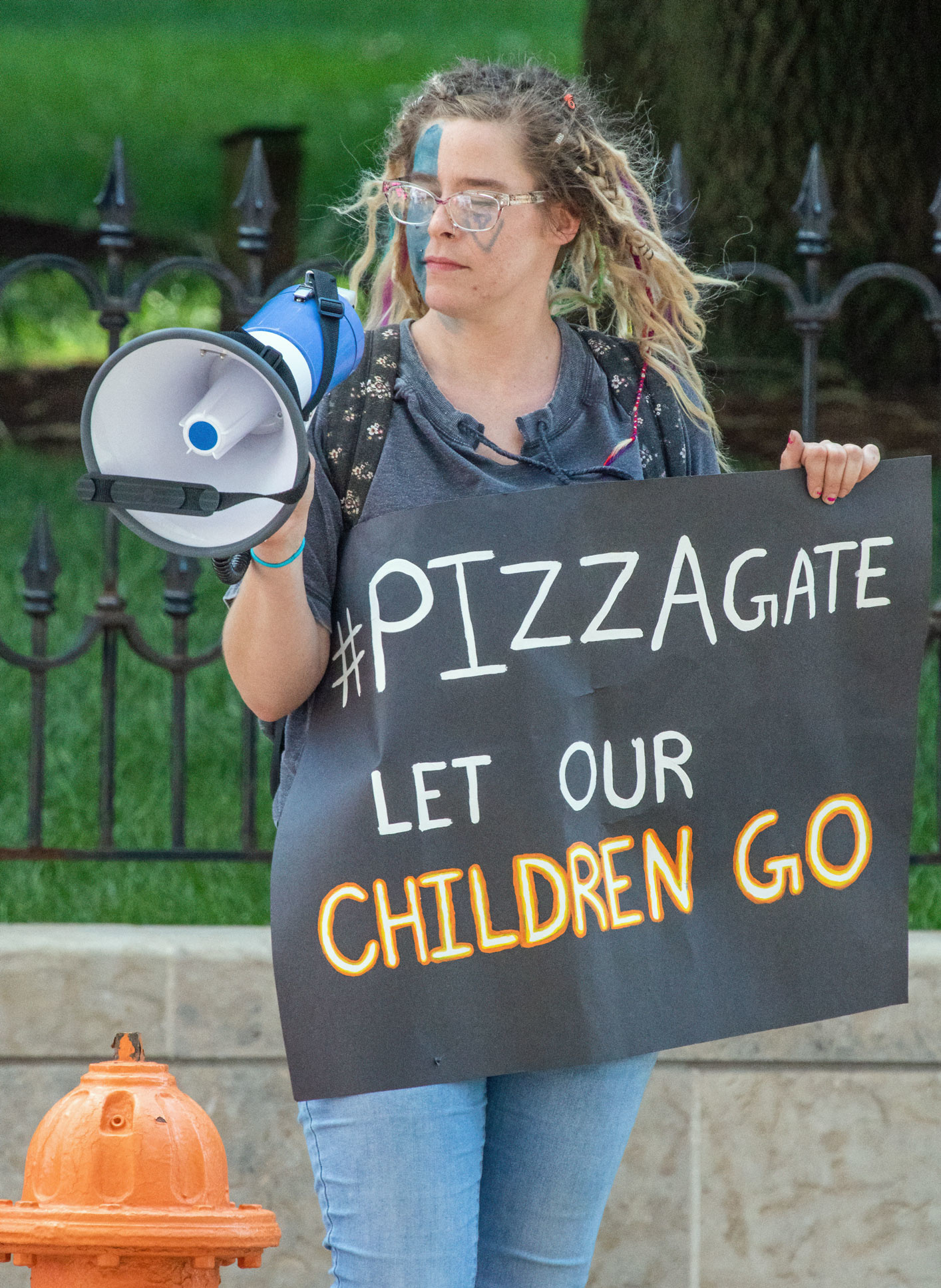
Protester advancing the Pizzagate conspiracy theory

According to QAnon researcher Mike Rothschild, "while Q has a number of precursor conspiracy theories and scams ... no conspiracy theory feeds more immediately into Q than Pizzagate". The Pizzagate theory began in 2016 with the leak of Clinton campaigner John Podesta's emails, which promoters of the theory believed contained a secret code detailing child sexual abuse. Pizzagate followers said that high-profile Democrats were sexually abusing children at a Washington, D.C. pizzeria, which led to an armed attack on the establishment by a gunman who believed those claims.

The allegations of child sexual abuse and the centrality of the Clinton family to this abuse became a key part of the QAnon belief system, but in time the Clintons' centrality was de-emphasized in favor of more general conspiratorial claims of an alleged worldwide elite of child sex traffickers. Q referred to Pizzagate claims without using the term. QAnon followers often used the hashtag #SaveTheChildren to promote the Pizzagate conspiracy theory. This caused protest from the unrelated non-governmental organization Save the Children.

=== Influence of 4chan culture ===
The investigative journalism website Bellingcat called /htg/ or "Human Trafficking General" threads on the /pol/ board of 4chan "the missing link" between Pizzagate and QAnon. Instead of focusing on a limited supply of email material to comb through, the /htg/ culture allowed users to actively participate in the imagined storylines. A key /htg/ poster was Anonymous 5 (also known as "Frank"), who claimed to be a child prostitution investigator. But the lack of a coherent narrative was a constraint on the /htg/ trend, and it never achieved Pizzagate's popularity.

The main tenets of the QAnon ideology were already present at 4chan before Q's appearance, including claims that Hillary Clinton was directly involved in a child sex ring, that Robert Mueller was secretly working with Trump, and that large-scale military tribunals were imminent. Q's posts specifically targeted individuals who were hated in the community beforehand, namely Clinton, Barack Obama, and George Soros. Bellingcat says that the idea of the "Storm" was copied from another poster named Victory of the Light, who predicted the "Event", in which mass, televised arrests of the "Cabal" were forthcoming.

=== Previous "anons" ===
In its most basic sense, an "anon" is an anonymous or pseudonymous Internet poster. The concept of anons "doing research" and claiming to disclose otherwise classified information, while a key component of the QAnon conspiracy theory, is not exclusive to it. Q was preceded by so-called anons who also claimed to have special government access. On July 2, 2016, the anonymous poster "FBIAnon", a self-described "high-level analyst and strategist" who claimed to have "intimate knowledge of the inner workings of the Clinton case", began posting false information about the 2016 investigation into the Clinton Foundation and claimed that Hillary Clinton would be imprisoned if Trump became president. Around that time, "HLIAnon", standing for "High-Level Insider Anon", hosted long question-and-answer sessions, dispensing various conspiracy theories, including that Princess Diana was murdered after trying to stop the September 11 attacks. Soon after the 2016 United States elections, two anonymous posters, "CIAAnon" and "CIAIntern", falsely claimed to be high-ranking Central Intelligence Agency (CIA) officers, and in late August 2017, "WHInsiderAnon" offered a supposed preview that something was "going to go down" regarding leaks that would affect the Democratic Party.

== Origin and spread ==
A 4chan user named "Q Clearance Patriot" first appeared on the site's /pol/ board on October 28, 2017, posting in a thread titled "Calm Before the Storm", a phrase Trump had previously used to describe a gathering of American military leaders he attended. "The Storm" later became QAnon parlance for an imminent event in which thousands of alleged suspects would be arrested, imprisoned, and executed for being child-eating pedophiles. The poster's username implied that they held Q clearance, a United States Department of Energy security clearance required to access Top Secret information on nuclear weapons and materials.

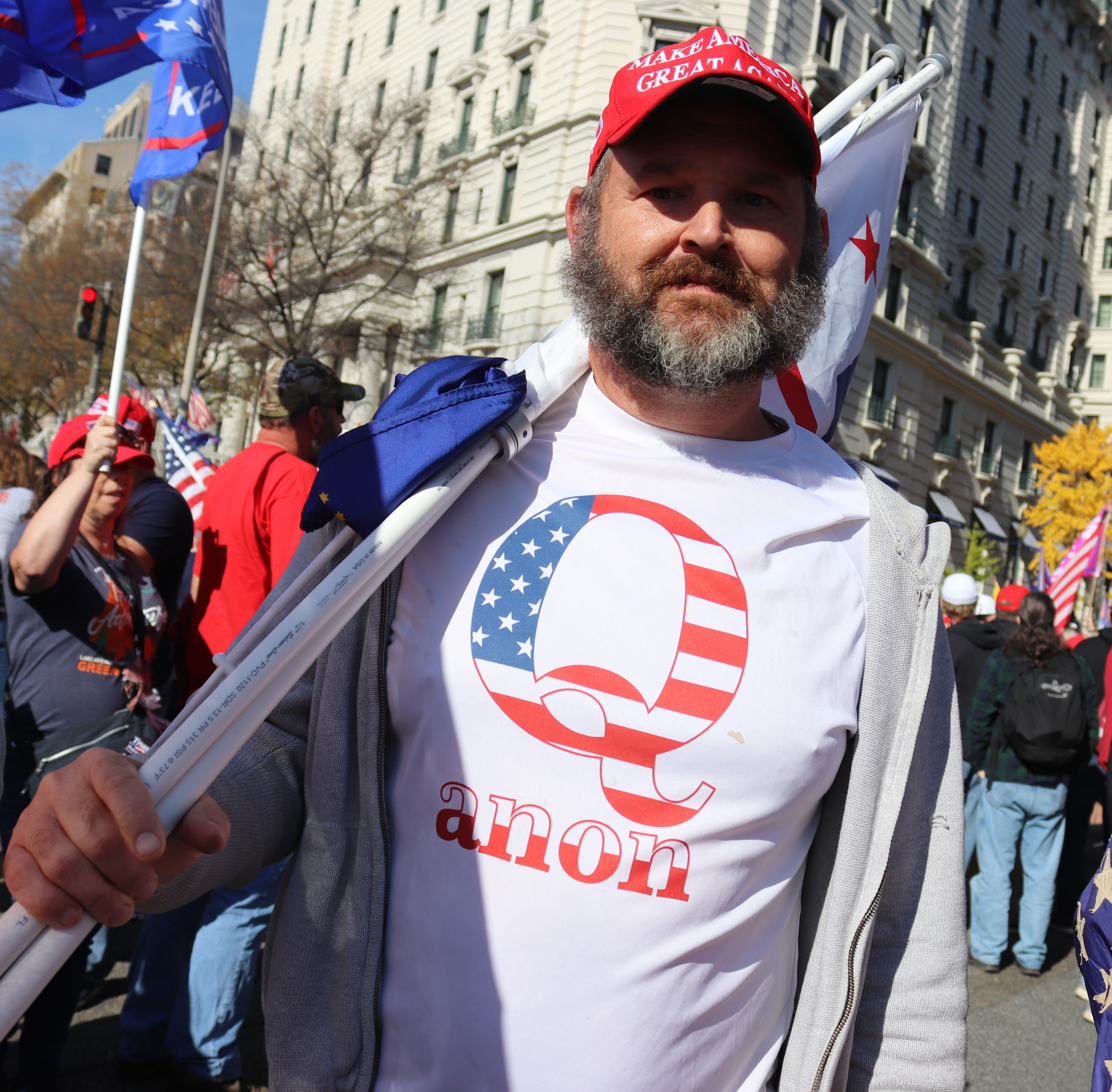
A pro-Trump protester wearing a t-shirt emblazoned with a common QAnon logo, at the "Stop the Steal" rally on November 14, 2020

Q's first post said that Hillary Clinton was about to be arrested, which would cause massive unrest and be followed by numerous other arrests. A second message was posted a few hours later, saying that Clinton was being "detained" though not arrested yet and that Trump was planning to remove "criminal rogue elements". The post also alluded cryptically to George Soros, Huma Abedin and Operation Mockingbird.

Q's activity surged in November, with most posts expanding upon previous theories about Hillary Clinton. Other conspiracy theories were added involving Barack Obama, Saudi Arabia, and Iran. An Internet community developed around analyzing posts attributed to Q, and several conspiracy theorists became minor celebrities in the community. Followers started looking for "clues" to confirm their beliefs, including common phrases and occurrences. In November 2017, Trump sipping water from a bottle was interpreted as a secret sign that the mass arrests would soon take place.

QAnon went further than Pizzagate by implying a worldwide cabal and incorporating elements from other conspiracies. One of the earlier rumors QAnon followers spread was that such figures as Hillary Clinton, her daughter Chelsea, and Senator John McCain had already been arrested and indicted, and were wearing ankle monitoring bracelets during their public appearances. In the following months, the QAnon community helped spread other rumors such as the "Frazzledrip" theory, which purported the existence of a "snuff" video showing Hillary Clinton and Huma Abedin murdering a child, drinking her blood and taking turns wearing the skin from her face as a mask.

In November 2017, two 4chan moderators, Paul Furber (also known as "BaruchtheScribe", a South African conspiracy theorist with an interest in U.S. politics) and Coleman Rogers (also known as "Pamphlet Anon"), worked with YouTuber Tracy Diaz to promote QAnon to a wider audience. This involved setting up the r/CBTS_Stream subreddit, where subscribers came to talk about QAnon. The subreddit was permanently closed in March 2018 due to incitement of violence and posting private information. QAnon spread to other social media, including Twitter and YouTube. Rogers and his wife, Christina Urso, launched Patriots' Soapbox, a YouTube livestream dedicated to QAnon, which they used to solicit donations. Future U.S. representative Lauren Boebert was a guest on Patriots' Soapbox during her 2020 congressional campaign. Posts by Q moved to 8chan, with Q citing concerns that the 4chan board had been "infiltrated". Thereafter, Q posted only on 8chan. In August 2019, 8chan was shut down after it was connected with the El Paso shooting and other violent incidents. Followers of QAnon then moved to Endchan, until 8chan was restored under the name 8kun.

=== Mainstream attention ===
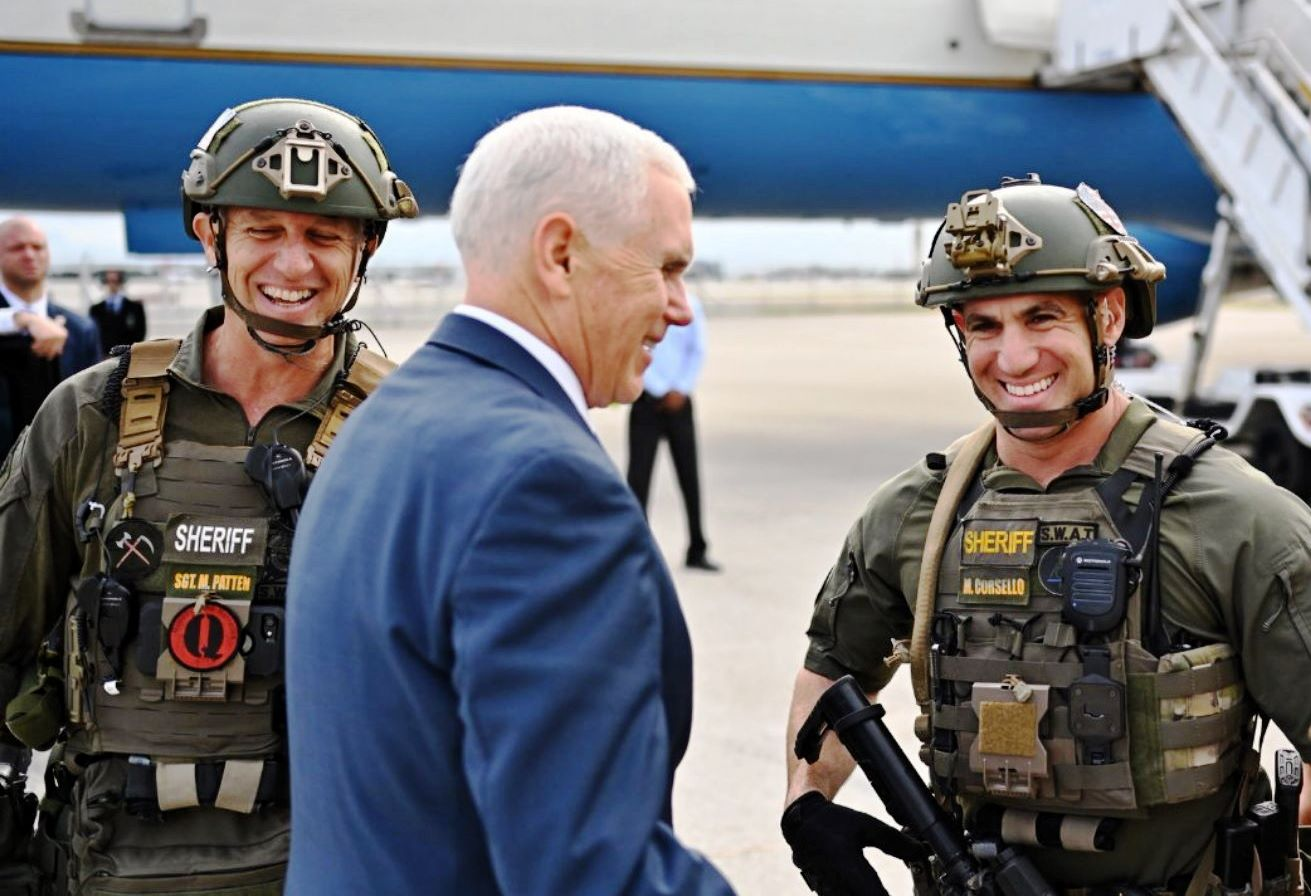
Vice President Mike Pence with Broward County SWAT team members, on November 30, 2018; the man on the left wears ...

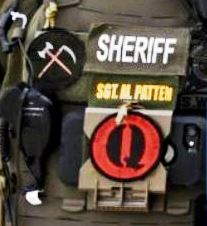
... a "Q" patch (close-up) used by followers of QAnon. (Note: The other circular patch is the SWAT team emblem. Regulations forbid wearing either.) The deputy was reprimanded and removed from the SWAT team as a result. The photo was tweeted, removed, and then replaced in Pence's feed.

QAnon first received attention from the mainstream press in November 2017. Newsweek called it "Pizzagate on steroids". Gossip columnist Liz Crokin, a Pizzagate follower, was one of the first public figures to embrace QAnon. She went on to become one of the movement's most prominent influencers. Fox News personality Sean Hannity and comedian Roseanne Barr spread the news about it to their social media followers in early 2018, and the conspiracy theory gained traction on the mainstream right. At this time, InfoWars host and far-right conspiracy theorist Alex Jones claimed to be in personal contact with Q. This led to the presence of QAnon followers at a July 2018 Trump rally for the midterm elections in Tampa, Florida, the first visible presence of the QAnon movement at Trump rallies.

Some Christian pastors introduced their congregations to QAnon ideas. The Indiana-based Omega Kingdom Ministry tried to combine QAnon and Christianity, with Q posts and Bible quotes both read during church services. Some Christians, such as pastor Derek Kubilus, call QAnon heresy, but most U.S. pastors have not taken a stand against it. More generally, QAnon's rise coincided with increasing radicalization and violent episodes in American far-right movements.

QAnon-related merchandise was widely available on Amazon's online marketplace in 2018. QAnon: An Invitation to the Great Awakening, a book said to be authored by a group of 12 QAnon followers, neared the top of Amazon's bestsellers list in 2019, possibly through algorithmic manipulation. Also in 2019, QAnon blogger Neon Revolt (an alias of former aspiring screenwriter Robert Cornero Jr.) self-published the book Revolution Q: The Story of QAnon and the 2nd American Revolution, which became an influential text among the QAnon community and was also distributed by Amazon. In 2020, Politico noted that 100 titles associated with QAnon were available on Amazon Marketplace, in many different languages and with generally positive reviews.

Sites dedicated to aggregating the Q posts, also called "drops" or "Q drops", became essential for their dissemination and spread. QMap was the most popular and famous aggregator, run by a pseudonymous developer and overall key QAnon figure known as "QAPPANON". QMap shut down shortly after the British fact-checking organization Logically published a September 2020 report that identified QAPPANON as a New Jersey-based security analyst named Jason Gelinas. Multiple online communities were created around QAnon: in 2020, Facebook conducted an internal investigation that revealed that the social network hosted thousands of QAnon-themed groups and pages, with millions of members and followers. One QAnon influencer, Austin Steinbart, stood out by claiming that Q was his own time-traveling future self.

According to Reuters, Russian-backed social media accounts promoted QAnon claims as early as November or December 2017. In 2021, a report from the Soufan Center, a research group focused on national security, found that one-fifth of 166,820 QAnon posts in the United States between January 2020 and February 2021 originated in foreign countries, primarily Russia and China, and that China was the "primary foreign actor touting QAnon-narratives online". The far-right Falun Gong-associated Epoch Media Group, including The Epoch Times, has also been a major promoter of the conspiracy theory.

University of Southern California professor and data scientist Emilio Ferrara found that about 25% of accounts that use QAnon hashtags, retweet InfoWars or had retweeted One America News Network were bots.

=== International following ===
Marc-André Argentino, a researcher of the movement, noted in August 2020 that QAnon-dedicated Facebook pages existed in 71 countries worldwide. In January 2021, researcher Joel Finkelstein told The Washington Post that the German and Japanese QAnon movements were "strong and growing", though according to a later New York Times report, the Japanese version (also known as "JAnon" [Japanese: Jアノン]) remains a fringe belief even among conspiracy theorists. Three pro-QAnon groups in Japan are known to exist as of 2022: J-Anon, QArmyJapanFlynn and YamatoQ. In April 2022, the Tokyo Metropolitan Police arrested several members of YamatoQ for breaking into a health clinic which provided COVID-19 vaccinations.

Between March and June 2020, during the COVID-19 pandemic, QAnon activity nearly tripled on Facebook and nearly doubled on Instagram and Twitter. By that time, QAnon had spread to Europe, from the Netherlands to the Balkan Peninsula.

In Germany, far-right activists and influencers have created a German audience for QAnon on YouTube, Facebook, and Telegram, estimated at 200,000 in 2020. German Reichsbürger groups adopted QAnon to promote its belief that modern Germany is not a sovereign republic but rather a corporation created by Allied nations after World War II, and expressed hope that Trump would lead an army to restore the Reich. A March 2022 study by the Center for Monitoring, Analysis and Strategy, a German think tank, found that more than one in ten people in Germany agreed with QAnon's theories and that Alternative for Germany (AfD) and Freedom Party of Austria (FPÖ) voters were more likely to believe in QAnon.

In Russia, a similar conspiracy theory, the "Soviet Citizens"—which claims the Russian Federation is a Delaware-based LLC that occupies the legal territory of the Soviet Union—also became susceptible to QAnon beliefs.

A 2020 survey conducted in Britain found that one in four respondents believed in QAnon-related theories, though only 6% supported QAnon. In October 2020, anti-racist advocacy group Hope not Hate said that British influencer Martin Geddes ran "one of the most popular QAnon Twitter accounts in the world". In October 2021, Rémy Daillet-Wiedemann, a French QAnon-associated conspiracy theorist, was charged with terrorism for having planned a coup against the French government. Various associates of Daillet-Wiedemann were also arrested and charged in late 2021 and early 2022.

Many Canadians have also promoted QAnon. In July 2020, a gunman and QAnon follower drove a vehicle into the grounds of Rideau Hall, the temporary residence of Canadian prime minister Justin Trudeau, to "arrest" Trudeau over COVID-19 restrictions and firearm regulations. A February 8 article in The Guardian described the 2022 convoy protests in Canada as the result of coordination between QAnon, conspiracy theorists, anti-vaccine and anti-government organizations. Romana Didulo, a Philippines-born Canadian woman claiming to be Canada's rightful "Queen", built an online following in the course of 2021, creating a cultlike organization using QAnon and sovereign citizen concepts. Because of Didulo's network of followers and calls for violence, researchers identified her in 2022 as one of the most dangerous QAnon influencers in Canada.

Cam Smith, an Australian researcher tracking far-right activity online, noticed mentions of QAnon in Australia's local communities as early as 2018. In 2020, when lockdown measures were imposed in Melbourne to contain an outbreak of COVID-19, a group of QAnon adherents from Queensland traveled there to protest, promoting QAnon as they went. A 2020 paper by the Institute for Strategic Dialogue revealed that Australia was the fourth-largest producer of QAnon content, after the United States, the United Kingdom and Canada.

The movement has spread to Spain and Latin America, with countries like Costa Rica, Colombia, Argentina, Mexico, Paraguay and Brazil having an online presence. La Nación reported in 2020 that the Facebook page "QAnon Costa Rica", which was spreading misinformation and fake news, had called for the ousting of President Carlos Alvarado and praised right-wing figures such as far-right presidential candidate Juan Diego Castro Fernández and controversial deputies Dragos Dolanescu Valenciano and Erick Rodríguez Steller. In Spain, the far-right Vox party was accused of endorsing anti-Biden conspiracy theories linked to QAnon on its Twitter account by claiming that Biden was the candidate "preferred by pedophiles". An RTVE news report found that most Spanish QAnon supporters identified Vox as their preferred political party.

== Claims ==
=== Q's posts ===
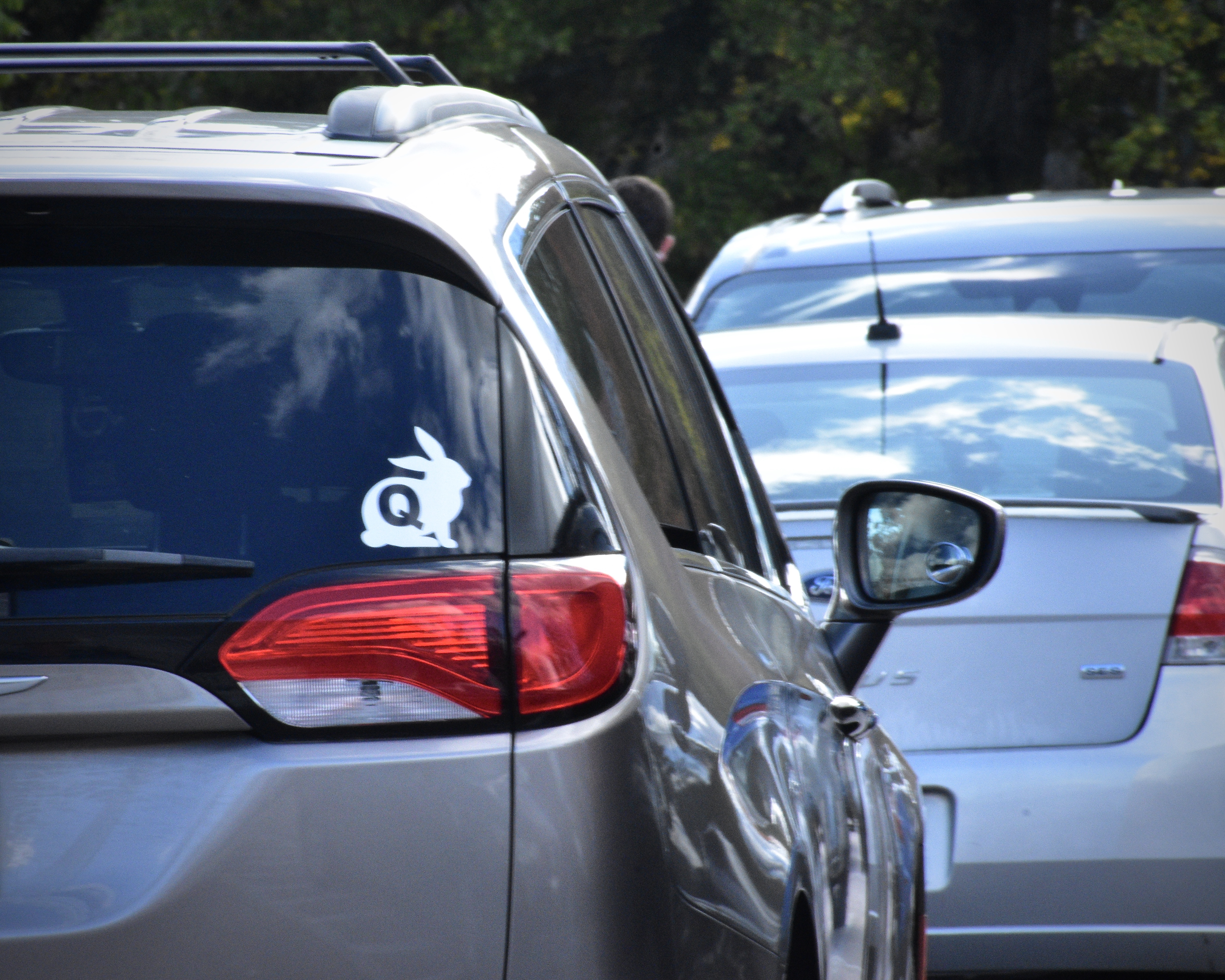
A QAnon logo based on a white silhouette of a rabbit, which signifies Q telling followers to "Follow the White Rabbit", i discover the hidden truth by doing their own research about the theory

Q made thousands of posts on 4chan and 8chan/8kun. These "drops" were often allusive, cryptic, and impossible to verify; some included strings of characters that are allegedly coded messages. Q used a conspiratorial tone, with phrases like "I've said too much" or "Some things must remain classified to the very end". To sustain faith in a final victory over the "cabal", Q used recurring phrases such as "Trust the plan", "Enjoy the show", and "Nothing can stop what is coming". Q's messages typically claimed that everything was going as planned, that Trump was in control, and that all his adversaries would end up in prison. Q also encouraged followers to do their own research by telling them to "Follow the White Rabbit". (Note: After a line of dialogue from the film The Matrix, which in turn referenced Alice's Adventures in Wonderland.) QAnon followers used the "White Rabbit" reference both as a hashtag and as the name of a Facebook group that had around 90,000 members in 2020.

Many early posts advanced claims about "deep state" collusion with foreign powers. In 2018, Q mentioned geopolitical conspiracies such as the Obama administration having planned to send technology to Iran and North Korea. Later, Q found new targets such as Planned Parenthood, which they accused of harvesting fetuses for profit, or Ruth Bader Ginsburg, who they said was a member of the cabal. Over the years, other topics of interest included Russian interference, child trafficking, Jeffrey Epstein, Antifa and Hunter Biden. Becoming increasingly vague over time, Q's posts allowed followers to map their own beliefs onto them and develop new variations of the theory.

The author Walter Kirn has described Q as an innovator among conspiracy theorists by enthralling readers with "clues" rather than presenting claims directly: "The audience for internet narratives doesn't want to read, it wants to write. It doesn't want answers provided, it wants to search for them." But Q often made specific predictions that did not prove correct:

- Hillary Clinton was about to be arrested and would attempt to flee the country (Note: "HRC extradition already in motion effective yesterday with several countries in case of cross border run. Passport approved to be flagged effective 10/30 @ 12:01 am. Expect massive riots organized in defiance and others fleeing the US to occur. US M's will conduct the operation while NG activated. Proof check: Locate an NG member and ask if activated for duty 10/30 across most major cities." – QAnon's first post on the /pol/ message board of 4chan, on October 28, 2017)
- John Podesta would be arrested on November 3, 2017, and public riots would be organized to try and prevent the arrest of other public officials
- A major event involving the Department of Defense would take place on February 1, 2018
- People targeted by Trump would commit suicide en masse on February 10, 2018
- There would be a car bombing in London around February 16, 2018
- A "smoking gun" video of Hillary Clinton would emerge in March 2018
- Something major would happen in Chongqing on April 10, 2018
- There would be a "bombshell" revelation about North Korea in May 2018
- The Trump military parade would "never be forgotten" (Note: The parade was canceled.)
- The Five Eyes "won't be around much longer"
- Mark Zuckerberg was going to leave Facebook and flee the United States (Note: A claim made in April 2018)
- Twitter CEO Jack Dorsey would be forced to resign "next" (in the context of the prediction of Zuckerberg's resignation) (Note: Dorsey remained CEO of Twitter until November 2021, when he was replaced by Parag Agrawal.)
- Pope Francis would have a "terrible May" in 2018

On multiple occasions, Q has dismissed these incorrect predictions as deliberate, claiming that "disinformation is necessary". This has led Australian psychologist Stephan Lewandowsky to emphasize the "self-sealing" quality of the conspiracy theory, highlighting its anonymous purveyor's use of plausible deniability and noting that evidence against it "can become evidence of [its] validity in the minds of believers". The numerous false, unsubstantiated claims Q has posted include:

- That the CIA installed North Korean leader Kim Jong-un as a puppet ruler
- That U.S. Representative and former Democratic National Committee chair Debbie Wasserman Schultz hired Salvadoran gang MS-13 to murder DNC staffer Seth Rich (Note: This is a version of the Seth Rich murder conspiracy theory, which is connected to the broader Clinton body count conspiracy theory, that had developed in the 1990s. The claims of this conspiracy theory were propagated from the same venues as Pizzagate, and both shared common attributes.)
- An apparent suggestion that German chancellor Angela Merkel is Adolf Hitler's granddaughter
- That Obama, Hillary Clinton, George Soros, and others are planning a coup against Trump and are involved in an international child sex-trafficking ring
- That the Mueller investigation was a counter-coup led by Trump, who pretended to conspire with Russia in order to hire Mueller to secretly investigate the Democrats and expose the child sex-trafficking ring
- That the Rothschild family leads a satanic cult, a centuries-old antisemitic trope against the family

=== The cabal and "the Storm" ===
Outside the US. Capitol during the January 6, 2021, riot, a Trump supporter carries a placard depicting Jesus in a MAGA hat with the QAnon hashtag "#WWG1WGA" visible in the lower right.

QAnon's core beliefs are that the world is controlled by a secret cabal of Satan-worshipping child molesters, Trump is secretly battling to stop them, and Q reveals details about the battle online. The cabal is thought to cover up its existence by controlling politicians, mainstream media, and Hollywood. Q's revelations imply that the cabal's destruction is imminent but also that it will be accomplished only with the support of the "patriots" of the QAnon community. This will happen at a time known as "the Event" or "the Storm", when thousands of people will be arrested and possibly sent to Guantanamo Bay prison or face military tribunals. The U.S. military will then take over the country, and the result will be salvation and utopia.

QAnon followers believe the cabal includes Democratic Party politicians like Joe Biden, Barack Obama and Hillary Clinton, business people like George Soros and Bill Gates, religious leaders like Pope Francis and the Dalai Lama, scientists like Anthony Fauci, and entertainers like Oprah Winfrey, Ellen DeGeneres, Lady Gaga and Chrissy Teigen. Tom Hanks is a special target for QAnon believers. When Hanks went into quarantine at the beginning of the COVID-19 pandemic, they spread a rumor that he had been arrested on child abuse charges. Other similar allegations followed and in July 2021, some QAnon adherents took seriously an article from Real Raw News, a fake news website, that claimed the U.S. military had executed Hanks. On the contrary, some QAnon followers believe other celebrities like Chris Cornell, Chester Bennington, Avicii, and Anthony Bourdain were murdered to cover-up their alleged involvement in a human trafficking documentary.

The claim that Trump stimulated the conspiracy of Russian interference in the 2016 presidential election to enlist Robert Mueller in the fight against the cabal involved the idea that Mueller would not only expose the sex-trafficking ring, but also prevent a coup d'état by Barack Obama, Hillary Clinton, and George Soros.

One key tenet in QAnon's narrative until the 2020 election was the recurring prediction that Trump would be re-elected in a landslide and spend his second term bringing about "the Storm" by undoing the deep state, disbanding the cabal and arresting its leaders. After Trump lost and Q stopped posting, QAnon followers continued to search for previously unseen clues in old posts or creating new spin-offs of the theory. They subsequently made predictions about Trump remaining president or returning to power, such as:

- Joe Biden's inauguration on January 20, 2021, would be an elaborate trap set for the Democrats, who would be arrested en masse and executed while Trump retained power.
- Trump would be inaugurated on March 4, 2021, as the 19th president.
- Trump would be inaugurated again on March 20, 2021. After this did not happen, QAnon adherents predicted it would happen on August 13, 2021.
- The Arizona audit would prove election fraud, handing the state to Trump, and other states would follow suit in a "domino effect", resulting in Trump being reinstated as president.
- The 2021 California gubernatorial recall election result would be proven fraudulent, which would catalyze a national fraud audit, resulting in Trump returning to power.
- John F. Kennedy (the 35th president of the United States, who was assassinated in 1963) or his son John F. Kennedy Jr. (who died in a plane crash in 1999) would appear alive in front of a crowd in Dallas on November 2, 2021, and announce Trump's reinstatement as president and the installation of Kennedy Jr. as vice president.

=== Child sex trafficking and satanic sacrifice ===
QAnon effectively merged with Pizzagate by incorporating its beliefs – namely that children are being abducted in a child trafficking ring, which followers equate with the cabal. They also see Trump as the only person fighting this criminal network. Added to this is the belief that politicians and Hollywood elites engage in "adrenochrome harvesting", in which adrenalin is extracted from children's blood to produce the psychoactive drug adrenochrome. (Note: Adrenochrome has become the subject of a number of myths since Hunter S. Thompson mentioned it in his 1971 book Fear and Loathing in Las Vegas.) This comprises claims that children are tortured, or sacrificed in Satanic rituals, to harvest the adrenaline that comes from fear. The aforementioned "Frazzledrip" video in which Hillary Clinton and Huma Abedin allegedly murdered a child was said to depict an "adrenochrome harvest". One version of the QAnon theory posits that the child abusers use adrenochrome as an elixir to remain young. In reality, adrenochrome has been produced by organic synthesis since at least 1952 and is synthesized for research purposes by biotechnology companies, which will then sell it to anyone; as it is not a controlled substance, medical or recreational use of the chemical is easy to access.

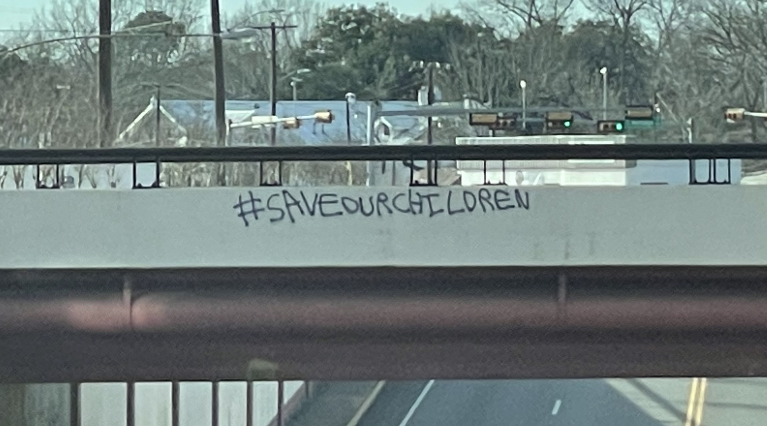
#SaveOurChildren graffiti on a bridge in Lufkin, Texas in 2021

In June 2020, a group led by QAnon promoter Timothy Charles Holmseth, which called itself the Pentagon Pedophile Task Force despite having no connection with the Pentagon or any U.S. governmental agency, attracted attention by spreading false claims about tens of thousands of children being held hostage and tortured in New York City. Also by 2020, some followers began using the Twitter hashtag #SaveTheChildren (#SaveOurChildren was also used), co-opting a trademarked name for the child welfare organization Save the Children. This led to an August 7 statement by Save the Children on the unauthorized use of its name in campaigns. In September, Facebook and Instagram tried to prevent #SaveTheChildren from being associated with QAnon by redirecting users who searched for the hashtag to the child welfare group. In October, Facebook announced it would try to limit the hashtag's reach.

In the same period, QAnon followers also created a conspiracy theory that falsely accused furniture company Wayfair, a competitor of Overstock in which QAnon promoter Patrick Byrne had been the CEO, of selling expensive furniture to launder money gained from child sex trafficking.

Similar groups in both the U.S. and the U.K. helped organize street protests that they say raise awareness of child sexual abuse and human trafficking. These protests and hashtags have often avoided social media restrictions and tend to attract more women and a more politically diverse and younger crowd than typical QAnon groups, including people opposed to Trump and his leadership. These groups are considered to be linked to the Pastel QAnon community.

QAnon's child abuse allegations against popular entertainers are based on the unproven claims of the actor Isaac Kappy, who in 2018 accused multiple Hollywood stars of pedophilia.

Travis View wrote in a Washington Post column that QAnon and Pizzagate conspiracy theorists harm the credibility of the fight against child sexual abuse, as their baseless claims are a distraction from actual crimes. Followers of these theories have also credited themselves for arrests of criminals in which they had no part: QAnon promoter Jordan Sather credited Jeffrey Epstein's arrest to 4chan and 8chan, while none of the investigative reporting nor the indictment referenced these forums. Some of the conspiracy theories about Epstein's death have also brought people to QAnon.

In May 2022, The New York Times reported that QAnon supporters were intercepting child migrants at the Mexico–United States border and collecting information about their families on the premise that they were falling prey to sex-trafficking schemes.

=== Other QAnon beliefs ===
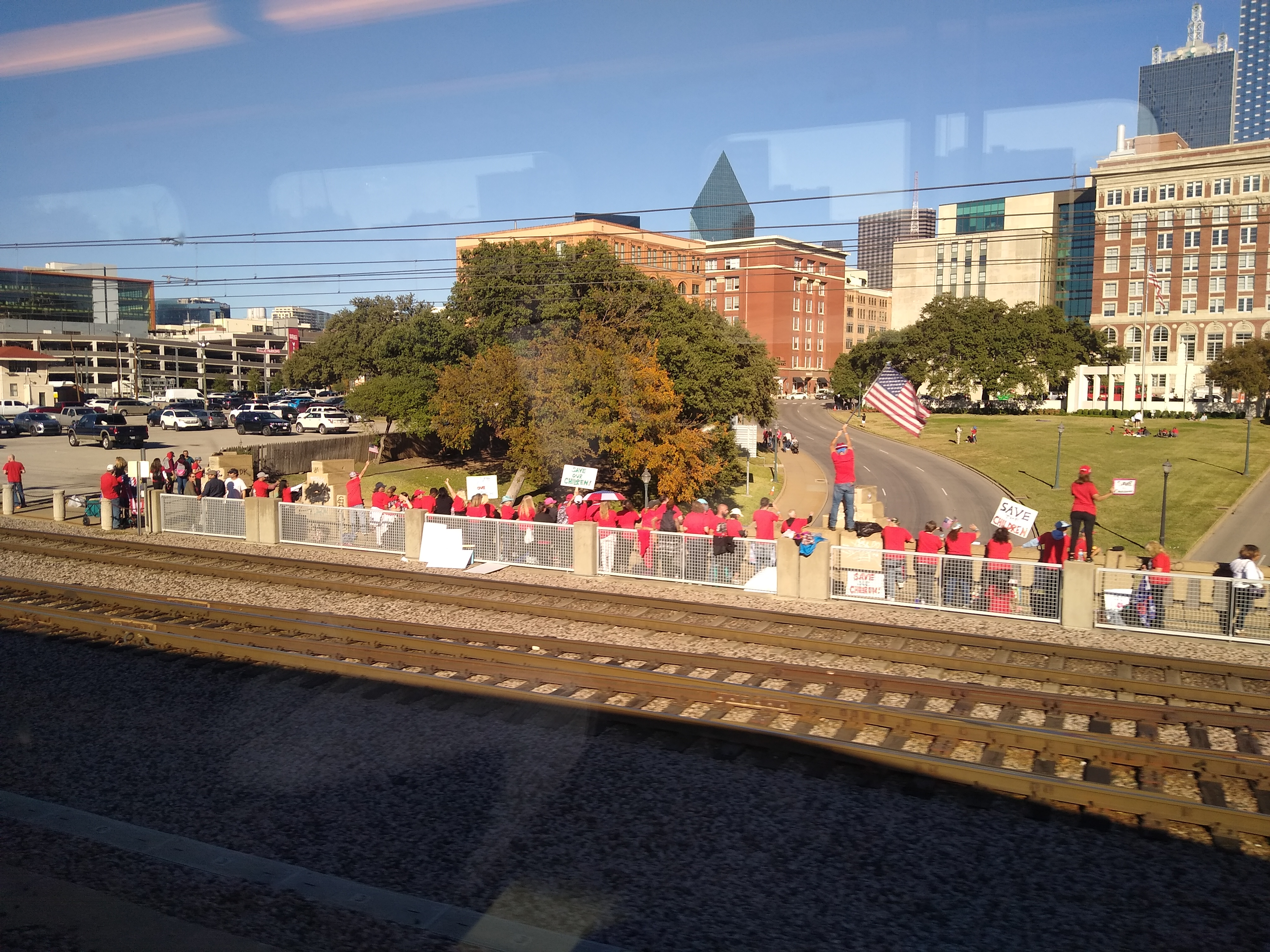
QAnon supporters awaiting the return of John F. Kennedy Jr. in Dealey Plaza, on November 22, 2021

QAnon Anonymous, a podcast dedicated to analyzing and debunking the QAnon movement, calls it a "big tent conspiracy theory" due to its ability to evolve and add new claims. QAnon has incorporated elements from many other preexisting conspiracy theories, such as those about the Kennedy assassination, U.F.O.s and 9/11. In 2018, Liz Crokin promoted the theory that John F. Kennedy Jr. faked his death and is Q. Other followers adopted variations of the Kennedy conspiracy theory, asserting that a Pittsburgh Trump supporter named Vincent Fusca is Kennedy Jr. in disguise and would be Trump's 2020 running mate. In November 2021, hundreds gathered in Dealey Plaza in Dallas, the site of President Kennedy's assassination, believing they would witness the return of Kennedy Jr., or both Kennedys. Attendees expected the event would herald Trump's reinstatement as president, that Trump would step down to allow Kennedy Jr. to become president, and that Kennedy Jr. would then name Michael Flynn as his vice president. According to QAnon researcher Will Sommer, about 20% of QAnon followers believe the JFK Jr. theory, while the majority finds it too "farcical on its face".

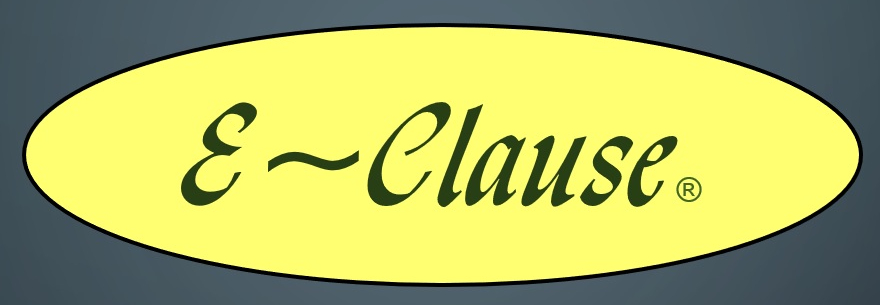
Logo of E-Clause, a pseudolaw firm based on sovereign citizen ideology associated with QAnon

Due to the overlap between the two movements, some QAnon followers have joined the sovereign citizens, a loose grouping of vexatious litigants and tax protesters whose set of pseudolegal beliefs implies that most laws and taxes are illegitimate and can be safely ignored if one uses the correct procedures. In 2022, the Anti-Defamation League reported that sovereign citizen ideology was attracting a growing number of QAnon adherents, as their belief in the Biden administration's illegitimacy meshed well with sovereign citizens' broader anti-government views.

In 2018, Q said that "vaccines [not all]" were part of the Big Pharma conspiracy. Later on, as anxiety and isolation linked to the COVID-19 pandemic fostered a rise of conspiracy theories and anti-vaccine discourse, many in the movement used the pandemic to promote QAnon. Very little of this was directed by Q posts, and Q did not mention the pandemic until March 23, 2020 (when they called COVID-19 the "China virus"), not using the name "COVID-19" until April 8. But influencers in the QAnon community were openly anti-mask and anti-vaccine, and helped spread denialism as well as other misinformation about the pandemic. QAnon conspiracy theorists touted drinking an industrial bleach (known as MMS, or Miracle Mineral Solution) as a "miracle cure" for COVID-19. Q suggested that hydroxychloroquine, endorsed by Trump at the time, was a cure for the disease, and accused Democrats of forcing infected patients into nursing homes, deliberately causing most COVID-related deaths in the U.S. Some QAnon followers have said that the pandemic is fake; others have claimed that the "deep state" created it. QAnon adherents also helped promote the conspiratorial video Plandemic.

In March 2022, CNN, France 24, and Foreign Policy reported that QAnon promoters were echoing Russian disinformation that created conspiracy theories about United States-funded laboratories in Ukraine. Russian state media falsely claimed that "secret United States biolabs" were creating weapons, a claim refuted by the U.S., Ukraine, and the United Nations. In reality, the laboratories were first established to secure and dismantle the remnants of the Soviet biological weapons program, and since then have been used to monitor and prevent new epidemics. The laboratories are publicly listed, not secret, and owned and operated by host countries such as Ukraine, not the U.S. QAnon followers have claimed to justify the Russian invasion of Ukraine as an effort by Putin and Trump to destroy "military" laboratories in Ukraine.

Until the invasion of Ukraine, QAnon-adjacent groups were hostile to China. In March 2022, analyst Elise Thomas wrote in a report for the Institute for Strategic Dialogue: "The dynamics of the invasion are shifting their views. In an astoundingly short space of time, Xi Jinping appears to have been recast from a villain to a hero in the QAnon conspiracy pantheon."

Supporters have also become invested in the NESARA economic conspiracy theory. In 2022, Bellingcat reported that many QAnon-related Telegram channels were becoming increasingly devoted to NESARA content.

Some adherents expressed belief in the reptilian conspiracy theory, asserting that the Satanic cabal alleged to be in power consists of shapeshifting reptilian humanoids. According to multiple news reports, this led some to kill suspected "lizard people". A California father attempted to kill his children for fear that they had inherited "serpent DNA" from their mother, while a Seattle-based member of the far-right Proud Boys who frequently alluded to and promoted QAnon-linked material on Facebook, sought to murder his brother on suspicion of reptilian ancestry.

== Analysis ==
=== Identity of Q ===
The Q persona is claimed to be that of a well-connected individual with access to highly sensitive government information, who put themself at risk by disclosing the information online. Q used a calm, authoritative tone, rarely interacted with other posters, and never argued with those who disagreed with their claims. In 2021, Bellingcat analyzed several little-known posts published by Q during the days that followed the first "drops". While containing text identical to later messages unambiguously authored by Q, these also showed Q being "out of character" and behaving in a manner similar to 4chan's other anonymous posters. Bellingcat's theory is that the author of these messages (Note: That author being the "Original Q" under the multiple individuals hypothesis) had not yet perfected the Q persona and was still settling into the voice of their online alter ego, which implies that Q was originally one 4chan poster among many instead of a powerful government insider.

Q's motives and identity have been the subject of much speculation and assumptions, both among QAnon followers and critics. Hypotheses on Q's identity have included a military intelligence officer, a Trump administration insider, but also public figures such as Michael Flynn, Stephen Miller, or Trump himself. In 2018, during the early days of QAnon, it was speculated that Q could be the puzzle organization Cicada 3301 creating the movement as a form of live action role-playing game, or a left-wing artist collective (emulating another collective, Luther Blissett, that authored a novel titled Q) playing an elaborate prank on right-wing online culture.

==== Multiple people ====
By 2020, it became accepted among researchers that the pseudonymous entity known as Q has been controlled by multiple people in cooperation. A stylometric analysis has suggested that two people likely wrote Q's posts, and that their "distinct signatures clearly correspond to separate periods in time and different online forums". An analysis of metadata of images posted by Q found that they were likely posted by someone in the Pacific Time Zone.

By design, anonymous imageboards such as 4chan and 8chan obscure their posters' identities. Those who wish to prove a consistent identity between posts while remaining anonymous can use a tripcode, which associates a post with a unique digital signature for any poster who knows the password. There have been thousands of posts associated with a Q tripcode. The tripcode associated with Q has changed several times, creating uncertainty about the poster's continuous identity. Passwords on 8chan are also easy to crack, and the Q tripcode has been repeatedly compromised and used by people pretending to be Q. When 8chan returned as 8kun in November 2019 after several months of downtime, the Q posting on 8kun posted photos of a pen and notebook that had been pictured in earlier 8chan posts to show the continuation of the Q identity, and continued to use Q's 8chan tripcode.

==== Paul Furber and the Watkins family ====
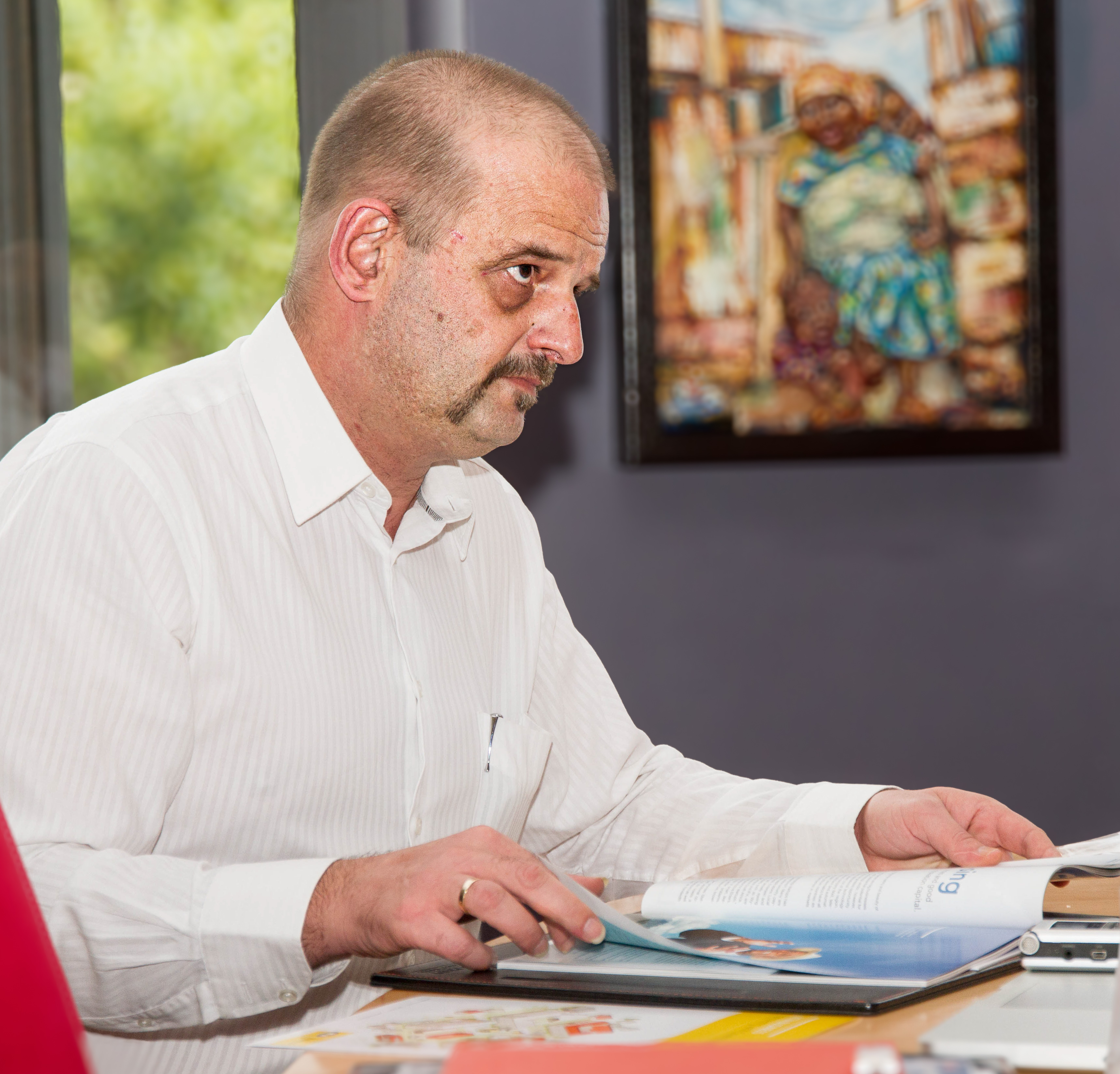
South African software engineer Paul Furber, who was a moderator on 4chan and 8chan

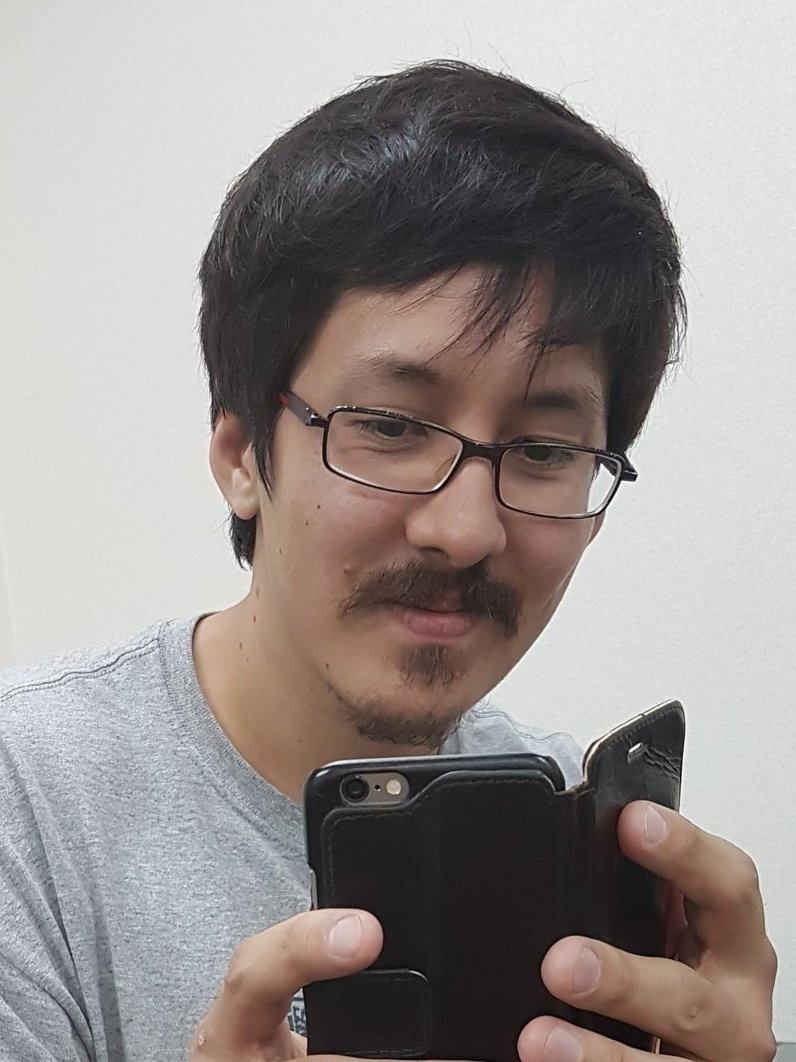
Ron Watkins, administrator of 8chan

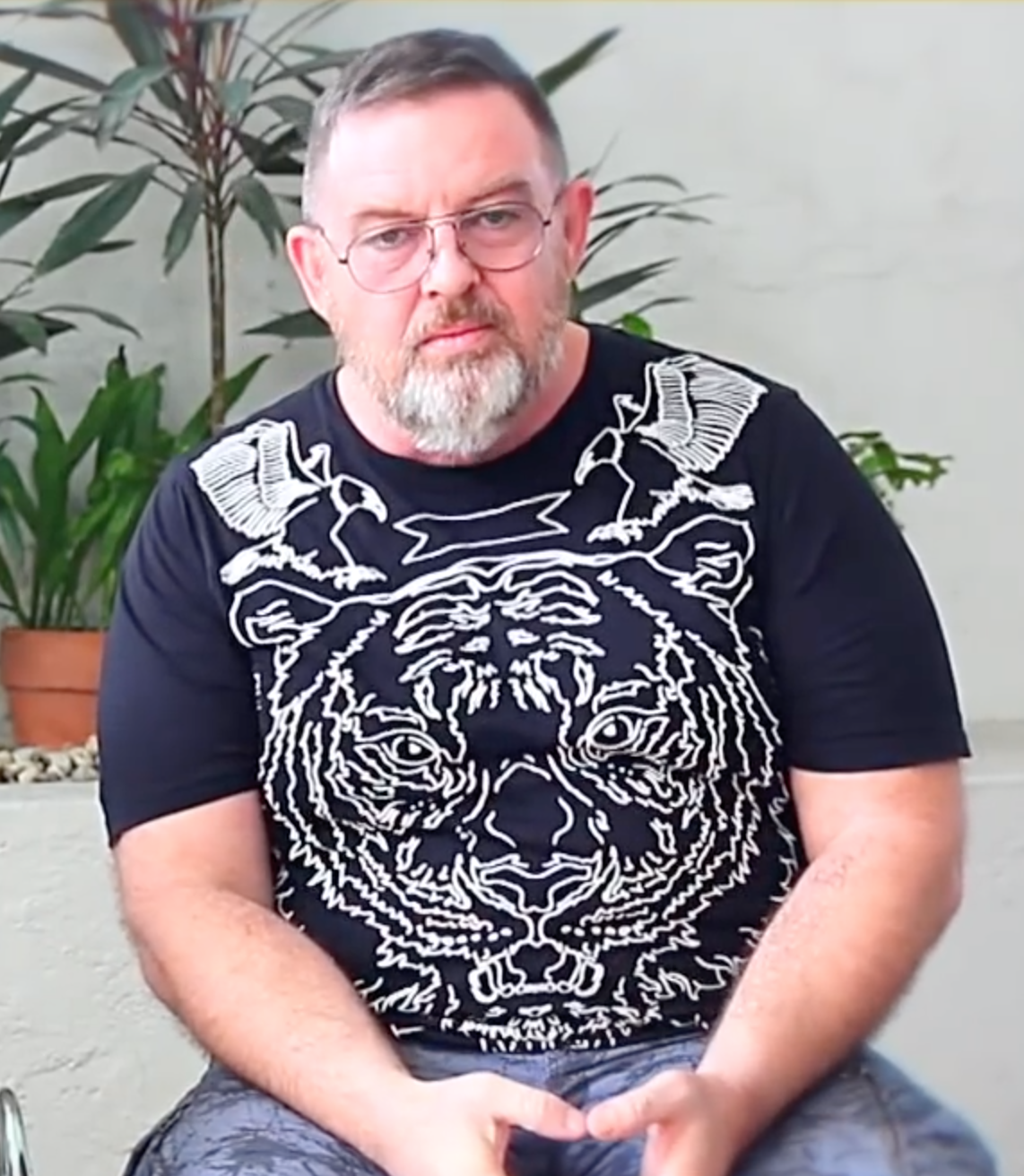
Jim Watkins, owner of 8chan

Fredrick Brennan, the original owner of 8chan, said in June 2020 that "Q either knows Jim or Ron Watkins or was hired by Jim or Ron Watkins". He later said that "If [Jim Watkins is] not 'Q' himself, he can find out who 'Q' is at any time. And he's pretty much the only person in the world that can have private contact with 'Q'."

In September 2020, Brennan speculated that the Q account was initially run by another person, with Jim and Ron Watkins taking over in late 2017 or early 2018. Brennan's theory is that the original 'Q' poster was Johannesburg resident Paul Furber, a 4chan and 8chan moderator and one of the first online commentators to promote QAnon. Evidence for this theory includes that Q's first password ("Matlock") was cracked on New Year's Day 2018 and, due to the nature of tripcodes, Furber was asked to verify that the new Q (with a new password/tripcode) was the same IP address as the old Q. Furber described this as "a lot of work", but something he'd been "called to do". Brennan further suspects that Ron Watkins seized control of the account from Furber by using his login privileges as 8chan's administrator. Furber has denied ever being Q. Both Jim and Ron Watkins have said they do not know Q's identity and have denied being Q.

The documentary filmmaker Cullen Hoback spent three years investigating the origins of QAnon and its connection to 8chan, conducting extensive interviews with Jim and Ron Watkins and Brennan. In the last episode of Q: Into the Storm, the 2021 HBO docuseries he produced from this research, Hoback showed his final conversation with Ron Watkins, who stated on camera:

I've spent the past ... almost ten years, every day, doing this kind of research anonymously. Now I'm doing it publicly, that's the only difference. ... It was basically ... three years of intelligence training teaching normies how to do intelligence work. It was basically what I was doing anonymously before but never as Q. [Watkins then laughed and added:] Never as Q. I promise. Because I am not Q, and I never was.

Hoback viewed this as an inadvertent admission by Watkins, and concluded from this interview and his other research that Watkins is Q. Watkins again denied being Q shortly before the series premiered.

On February 19, 2022, The New York Times reported that analysis of the Q posts by two independent forensic linguistics teams using stylometry techniques indicated that Paul Furber was the main author of the initial Q posts, and Ron Watkins took over at the start of 2018. The change seems to have occurred after Q moved from 4chan to 8chan. At the time, Furber had complained that Q had been "hijacked" and that Ron Watkins was complicit. Furber responded to inquiries by saying that Q's writing style had influenced his own, not the other way around.

Before Q's reappearance in June 2022, 8kun changed its salt, meaning it would have been impossible for a user to have the same tripcode as before. Yet Q's tripcode remained the same as it was in 2020, suggesting that 8kun's administrators either knew Q was going to post again or made the post themselves. Soon after, 8kun changed its salt back to the original. Jim Watkins also confirmed the new Q drops' authenticity within hours of their publication.

=== Slogans and vocabulary ===
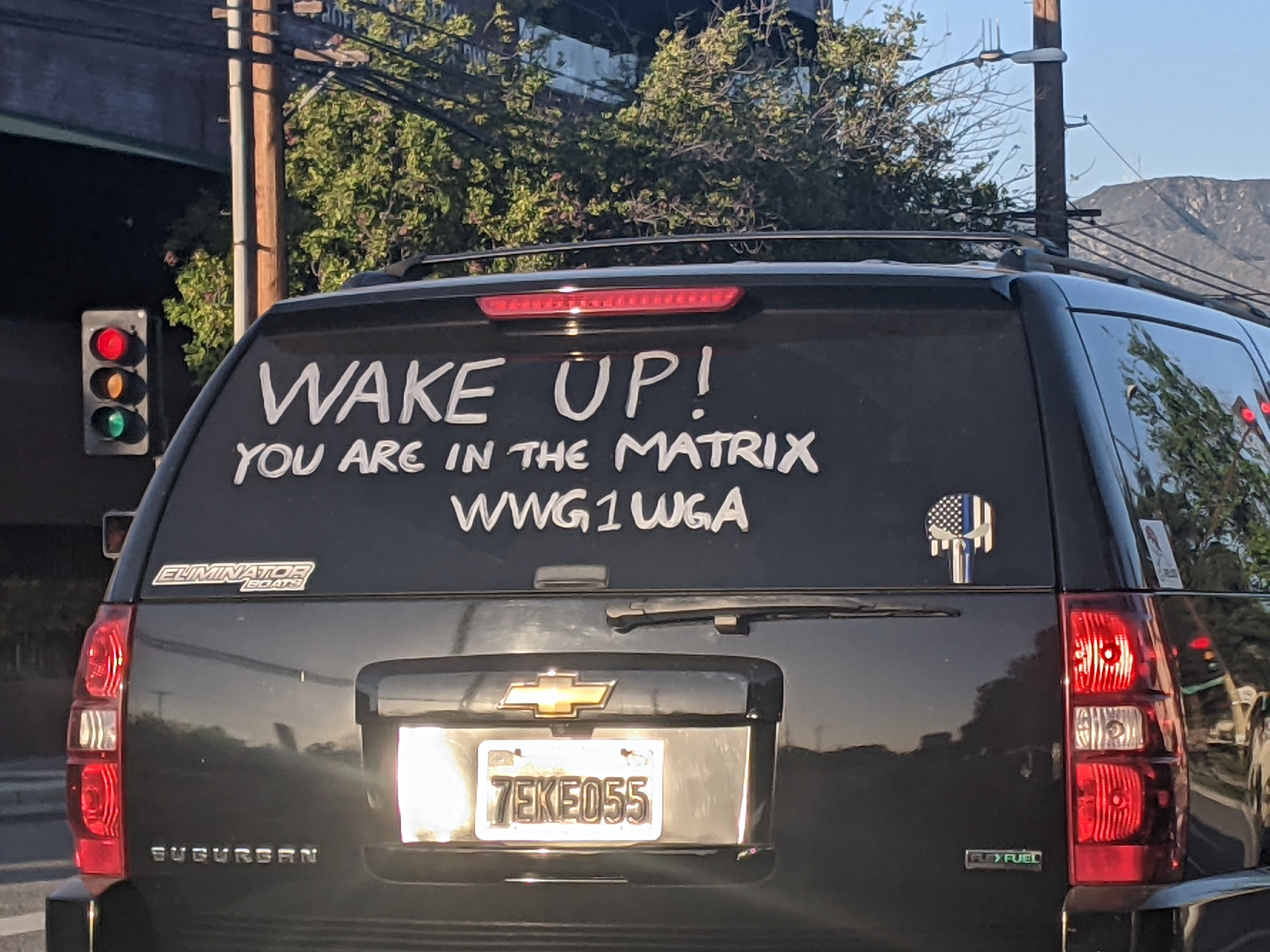
The popular QAnon slogan "WWG1WGA" ("Where we go one, we go all"), with a reference to The Matrix, painted on an SUV

The spread of QAnon has been accompanied by a series of slogans, catchphrases, buzzwords and hashtags that helped boost its popularity and online presence. Terms like the cabal or the Storm, and Q's recurring phrases like "Trust the plan" or "Enjoy the show" are among the most popular. Q's "drops" are also known as "crumbs" (Q has used the term) or "breadcrumbs". In turn, followers of the conspiracy who analyze these posts have called themselves "bakers" who assemble the "crumbs" to make "dough", or "bread", as they weave the clues into a better understanding of the narrative.

One early rallying cry among QAnon followers was "Follow the White Rabbit". A popular QAnon slogan is "Where we go one, we go all" (frequently abbreviated as "WWG1WGA"), (Note: Derived from the 1996 film White Squall and sometimes misattributed to John F. Kennedy.) first used by Q in April 2018. The phrase "Do your own research" (or "Do the research") encourages people to look for "clues" that will confirm QAnon narratives. "Q sent me" has been a declaration of "allegiance" to Q.

Other common phrases in QAnon parlance include "white hat" (a Trump supporter), "black hat" (someone in league with the deep state), "Great Awakening" (the point at which the public wakes up to the truth), "red pill" (Note: A reference to The Matrix, like the "Follow the White rabbit" slogan.) ("taking the red pill" means achieving QAnon awareness), or "sheeple" (a disparaging term for people who believe the mainstream media narrative). "17anon" has sometimes been used as an alternative spelling of QAnon (Q being the 17th letter of the alphabet) and a way of circumventing social media algorithms.

=== Derivative elements ===
Conspiracy theories have long been present in United States politics, including those promoted by right-wing groups like the John Birch Society. As it incorporates elements from many other conspiracy theories, QAnon displays similarities with previous narratives, imagery and moral panics, whether political or religious in nature. In Salon, Matthew Rozsa wrote that QAnon may best be understood as an example of what historian Richard Hofstadter called "The Paranoid Style in American Politics", the title of his 1964 essay on religious millenarianism and apocalypticism. Like Pizzagate, QAnon has some resemblance to the Satanic panic of the 1980s, when hundreds of daycare workers were falsely accused of abusing children.

==== Apocalypticism and Millenarianism ====
QAnon's "explicitly Christian" vocabulary echoes longstanding Christian theological and eschatological traditions, particularly those rooted in apocalypticism and millenarian expectations. Central to QAnon's narrative are concepts such as the "Storm" (the Genesis flood narrative or Judgment Day), the "Great Awakening" (evoking the reputed historical religious Great Awakenings of the early 18th century to the late 20th century), and an emphasis on prophecy, leading it to be sometimes construed as an emerging religious movement.

QAnon followers, while seeing Trump as a flawed Christian, also view him as a messiah sent by God "who will triumph over Satan through a series of cataclysmic events". According to one QAnon video, the battle between Trump and "the cabal" is of "biblical proportions", a "fight for earth, of good versus evil". Some QAnon supporters say the coming reckoning will be a "reverse rapture", that is "a revelation that means not only the end of the world but a new beginning", according to American political author Alexander Reid Ross.

==== Evangelical influences ====
Religious studies scholar Julie Ingersoll argues that evangelicals have "helped make widespread acceptance of QAnon possible by weaving their theological commitments to apocalypticism, conspiracies and persecution narratives into the larger American culture." Messianic, apocalyptic, and spiritual warfare themes which became popular in evangelical media beginning in the 1970s – as well as conspiracy theories such as the New World Order that are popular among the same demographic – have been described as influences on the QAnon belief system, as well as aspects of QAnon that appeal to evangelicals.

The apocalyptic stories are seen by Christians as fictional depictions of real future events, giving them real-world significance. American studies scholar S. Jonathon O'Donnell argues that QAnon, which sees Trump as fighting a demonic deep state, has significant commonalities with Christian spiritual warfare – and their followers overlap as well. "QAnon is, in effect, one part Frank Peretti spiritual warfare, one part Left Behind series apocalypticism, and one part Elders of Zion antisemitic conspiracy theory, packaged together in a tantalizing, self-involving variation on Celebrity Apprentice reality television and social media", writes one scholar.

==== Dualism ====
The movement "strikingly builds on Christian dualism". Theological frameworks such as presuppositionalism, which claims that all true knowledge is revealed by God as opposed to faulty human reason, have been argued to lead to us–versus–them thinking which easily expands from the theological sphere to the political in QAnon.

==== Antisemitism ====
According to the Anti-Defamation League, while "the vast majority of QAnon-inspired conspiracy theories have nothing to do with anti-Semitism", they described a review of QAnon tweets about Israel, Jews, Zionists, the Rothschilds, and Soros as "reveal[ing] some troubling examples". Ethan Zuckerman and Mike McQuade have argued that QAnon "is more anti-elite than explicitly anti-Semitic". The Washington Post and The Forward magazine have called QAnon's targeting of Jewish figures like George Soros and the Rothschilds "garden-variety nonsense with racist and anti-Semitic undertones" and containing "striking anti-Semitic elements". A Jewish Telegraphic Agency article in August 2018 asserted: "Some of QAnon's archetypical elements—including secret elites and kidnapped children, among others—are reflective of historical and ongoing anti-Semitic conspiracy theories."

QAnon's adrenochrome-harvesting claims have been linked to blood libel by the followers (who believe in the truthfulness of both) and researchers of QAnon. Blood libel is a medieval antisemitic myth that says Jewish people murder Christian children and use their blood to make matzo for Passover. In February 2022, social media users shared images of a sculpture of Simon of Trent, whose death was falsely blamed on the town's Jewish population, as evidence that elites harvest adrenochrome from children's blood.

Genocide scholar Gregory Stanton has called QAnon a "Nazi cult rebranded" and a new version of The Protocols of the Elders of Zion, a fabricated antisemitic text published in 1903, deriving from antisemitic canards. Republican QAnon follower Mary Ann Mendoza was noted for her reference to the antisemitic text when she retweeted a Twitter thread about the Rothschild family, Satanic High Priestesses, and American presidents saying, "The Protocols Of The Elders Of Zion is not a fabrication. And, it certainly is not anti-Semitic to point out this fact." (Note: Mendoza sits on the advisory board of Women for Trump and was scheduled to speak at the 2020 Republican convention until news of her Twitter activity came out; she later denied knowing the content of the thread.) An April 2021 Morning Consult poll found that 49% of Americans who believe in QAnon agree with the Protocols, and that 78% of Americans who agree with the Protocols also believe in QAnon.

In 2021, the Anti-Defamation League reported that neo-Nazis were exploiting the absence of leadership among QAnon adherents on Telegram to promote antisemitic conspiracy theories. QAnon conspiracy theorists have promoted Europa: The Last Battle, a neo-Nazi propaganda film which promotes antisemitic conspiracy theories, including Holocaust denial. They have also promoted content from Disclose.tv, a German disinformation outlet with a following that includes Holocaust deniers and neo-Nazis.

=== Appeal ===
Experts have classified QAnon's appeal as comparable to those of religious cults. According to an expert in online conspiracy, Renee DiResta, QAnon's pattern of enticement is similar to that of cults in the pre-Internet era where, as the targeted person was led deeper and deeper into the group's secrets, they became increasingly isolated from friends and family outside the cult. Online support groups developed for those whose loved ones were drawn into QAnon, notably the subreddit r/QAnonCasualties, which grew from 3,500 participants in June 2020 to 28,000 by October. QAnon virtual communities have little "real world" connection with each other, but online they can number in the tens of thousands. Rachel Bernstein, an expert on cults who specializes in recovery therapy, said, "What a movement such as QAnon has going for it, and why it will catch on like wildfire, is that it makes people feel connected to something important that other people don't yet know about. ... All cults will provide this feeling of being special." There is no self-correction process within the group, since the self-reinforcing true followers are immune to correction, fact-checking, or counter-speech, which is drowned out by the cult's groupthink. QAnon's cultish quality has led to its characterization as a possible emerging religious movement. It has also been called a syncretic movement.

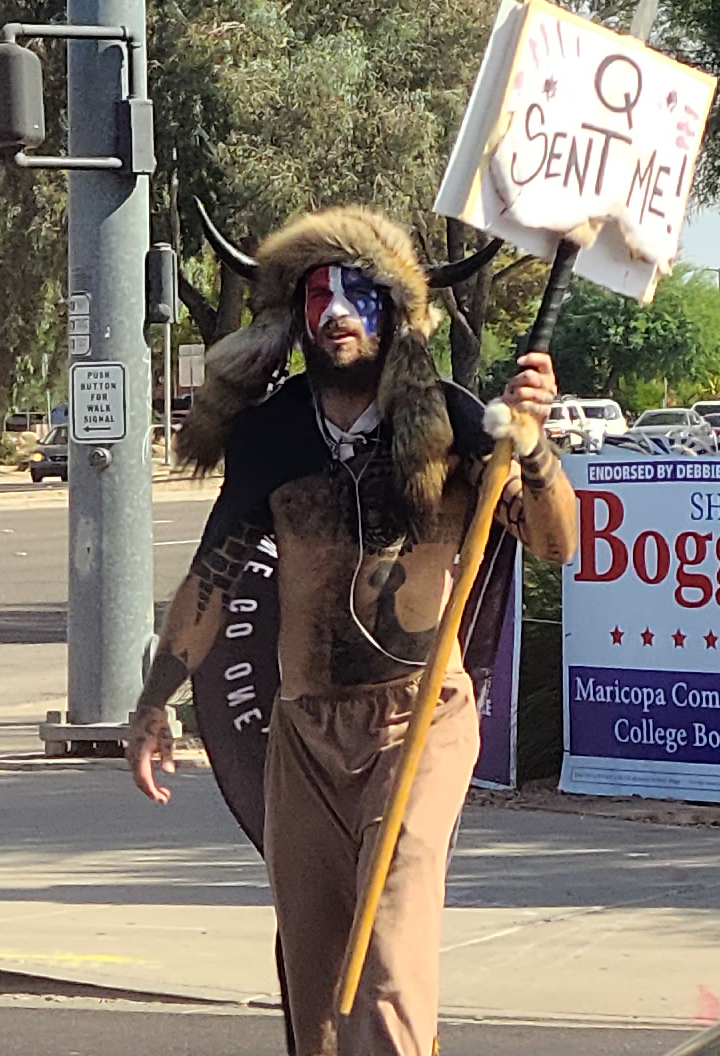
Jacob Chansley, also known as "QAnon Shaman", a prominent proponent of QAnon and stormer at the U.S. Capitol attack, carrying a "Q Sent Me" placard

Travis View, a researcher who studies QAnon, says that it is as addictive as a video game, and offers the "player" the possibility of being involved in something of world-historical importance. According to View, "You can sit at your computer and search for information and then post about what you find, and Q basically promises that through this process, you are going to radically change the country, institute this incredible, almost bloodless revolution, and then be part of this historical movement that will be written about for generations." View compares this to mundane political involvement in which one's efforts might help to get a state legislator elected. QAnon, says View, competes not in the marketplace of ideas, but in the marketplace of realities. The belief in "The Plan" that Q alleged was in place to defeat the deep state and the cabal boosted the confidence of QAnon followers, who were told that things were happening behind the scenes and that victory would inevitably follow if they trusted Trump and the secret plan. QAnon believers try to solve riddles presented in Q's posts by connecting them to Trump speeches and tweets and other sources. The New Yorker has likened QAnon to "a form of interactive role-playing". Some followers used a "Q clock" consisting of a wheel of concentric dials to decode clues based on the timing of Q's posts and Trump's tweets.

American sociologist Mark Juergensmeyer says he "find[s] QAnon consistent with many other extremist religiopolitical movements ... including those that have arisen in response to the recent global crises of mass migration, economic globalization, and now a global pandemic". Brian Levin, director of the Center for the Study of Hate and Extremism at California State University, San Bernardino, said QAnon has "the visceral appeal of an anti-elite message that is elastic enough to capture a lot of folks who feel fear and disenfranchisement from the current political system". Scholar Mia Bloom describes it as "unique among conspiracy theories in its ability to mutate and adapt to its environment," stating "[i]t has successfully absorbed local grievances abroad and takes on whatever local issues are central". She also argues that QAnon's acceptance of movements such as vaccine skepticism have helped it spread into unexpected demographics that share those commonalities.

Survey data showed in late 2020 that a quarter of those who knew about QAnon thought there was some truth to it. In a conspiracy theory environment, primary institutions of society that once served as trusted impartial authorities are easily rejected if they contradict the theory, making it difficult to counter the thinking of QAnon followers.

=== Disillusionment ===
Travis View of the QAA Podcast says:

People in the QAnon community often talk about alienation from family and friends. ... Though they typically talk about how Q frayed their relationships on private Facebook groups. But they think these issues are temporary and primarily the fault of others. They often comfort themselves by imagining that there will be a moment of vindication sometime in the near future which will prove their beliefs right. They imagine that after this happens, not only will their relationships be restored, but people will turn to them as leaders who understand what's going on better than the rest of us.

Disillusionment can also come from the failure of the theories' predictions. Q predicted Republican success in the 2018 US midterm elections and claimed that Attorney General Jeff Sessions was involved in secret work for Trump and that despite outward tension, the two were allies. When Democrats made significant gains and Trump fired Sessions, many in the Q community were disillusioned.

Further disillusionment came when a predicted December 5 mass arrest and imprisonment in Guantanamo Bay detention camp of Trump's enemies did not occur, nor did the dismissal of charges against Trump's former national security advisor Michael Flynn. For some, these failures began a separation from QAnon, while others urged direct action in the form of an insurrection. Psychologist Robert Lifton said such a response to a failed prophecy is not unusual: apocalyptic cults such as Heaven's Gate, the People's Temple, the Manson Family, and Aum Shinrikyo resorted to mass suicide or mass murder when their expectations did not materialize. Lifton called this "forcing the end". View echoed the concern that disillusioned QAnon followers might take matters into their own hands as Pizzagate follower Edgar Maddison Welch did in 2016, Matthew Phillip Wright did at Hoover Dam in 2018, and Anthony Comello did in 2019, when he murdered Mafia boss Frank Cali, believing he was under Trump's protection. In February 2019, Liz Crokin said that she was losing patience waiting for Trump to arrest the supposed members of the child sex ring, and warned that people might conduct "vigilante justice".

=== Demographics ===
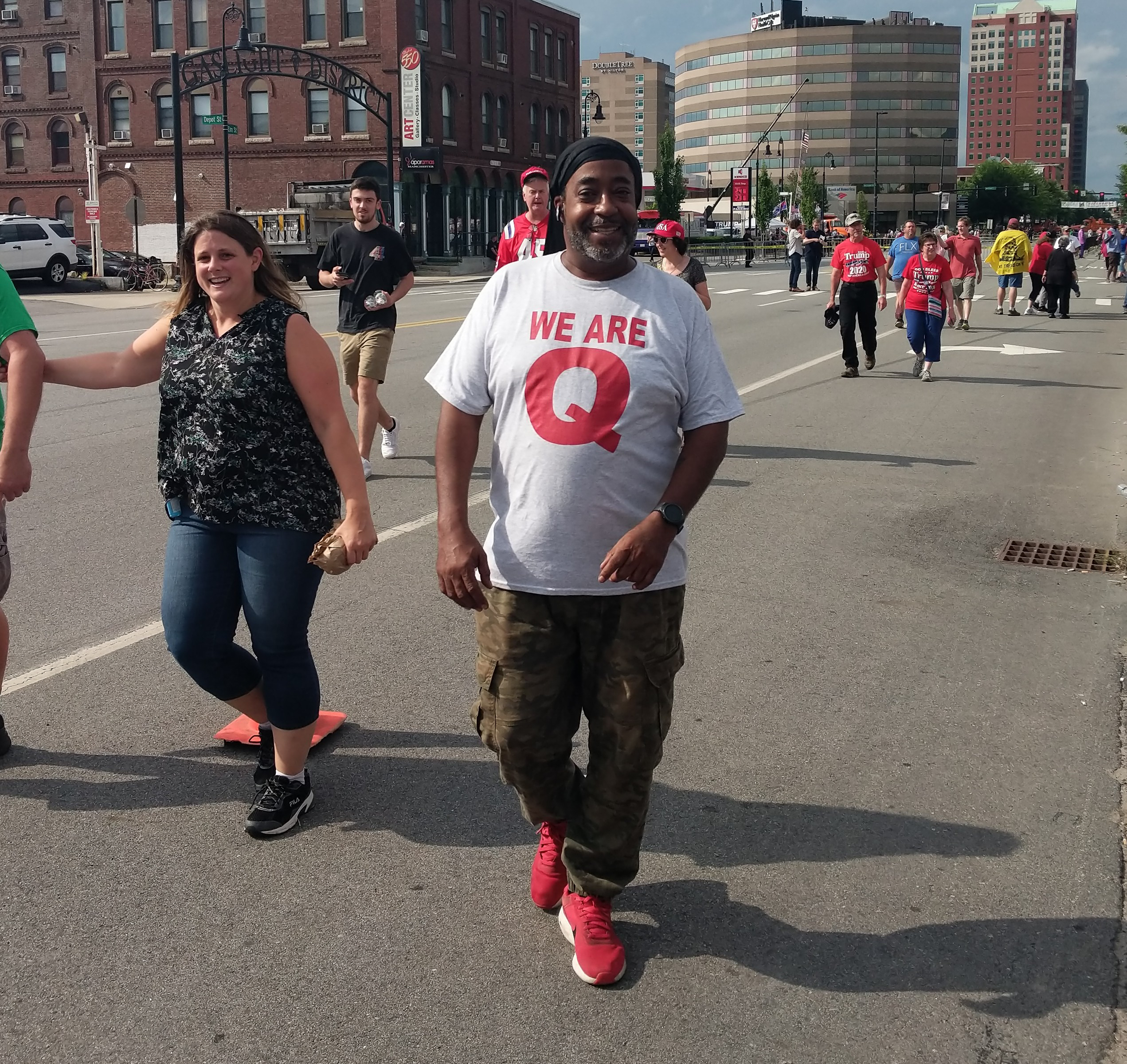
Man wearing a "We Are Q" shirt at a Trump rally in New Hampshire

According to an August 2018 Qualtrics poll for The Washington Post, 58% of Floridians were familiar enough with QAnon to have an opinion about it. Of those who had an opinion, most were unfavorable. The average score on the feeling thermometer was just above 20, a very negative rating, and about half of what other political figures enjoy. Positive feelings toward QAnon were strongly correlated with susceptibility to conspiracy thinking.

According to a March 2020 Pew survey, 76% of Americans had never heard of QAnon, 20% had heard "a little about it", and 3% said they had heard "a lot". The survey showed 39% of those identifying as liberal democrats knew a little or more about Qanon while only 18% of people who were republican or leaned republican reported knowing a little or more about Qanon. In September 2020, a Pew survey of the 47% of respondents who said they had heard of QAnon found that 41% of Republicans and those who lean Republican believed QAnon was good for the country, compared to 7% of Democrats and those who lean Democratic.

An October 2020 Yahoo-YouGov poll found that even if they had not heard of QAnon, a majority of Republicans and Trump supporters believed top Democrats were engaged in sex-trafficking rings and more than half of Trump supporters believed he was working to dismantle the rings.

In February 2021, an American Enterprise Institute poll found that 29% of Republicans believe the central claim of QAnon, that "Donald Trump has been secretly fighting a group of child sex traffickers that include prominent Democrats and Hollywood elites." A March 2021 Public Religion Research Institute (PRRI) and Interfaith Youth Core survey found similar results: Republicans (28%) were twice as likely as Democrats (14%) to agree that the "elites" would soon be swept from power by a coming "storm"; Republicans (23%) were three times as likely as Democrats (8%) to agree that "Satan-worshipping pedophiles" control the government and media; and Republicans (28%) were four times as likely as Democrats (7%) to agree that "true American patriots may have to resort to violence" to resolve the situation.

Surveys have found that conspiracy theories such as QAnon are most popular among white Americans, especially evangelicals. A May 2021 PRRI survey confirmed that white evangelicals are among QAnon's strongest supporters, but also found that Hispanic Protestants are drawn to the movement in even larger proportions. According to the PRRI's figures, the core QAnon belief that global elites form a group of Satan-worshipping pedophiles and child sex traffickers is held in the U.S. by 26% of Hispanic Protestants, 25% of White evangelical Protestants, 24% of other Protestants of color, 18% of Mormons, 16% of Hispanic Catholics, 14% of African American Protestants, 14% of other Christians, 13% of non-Christian religious people, 11% of White Catholics, 11% of religiously unaffiliated people, 10% of white mainline Protestants, and 8% of Jews.

An analysis of four 2021 PRRI surveys showed that belief in QAnon increased in the U.S. after Trump left office. In March 2021, 14% of Americans considered themselves QAnon believers, increasing to 17% by October. In the average of the four surveys, about 22% of Americans believed that there was a "storm coming soon that will sweep away the elites in power", and 16% shared the core QAnon belief that the government, the media and the financial elite are controlled by Satanic pedophiles. In 2024, another poll conduced by PPRI found that 19% of Americans believed in the core theories associated with QAnon, up from 14% in 2021, and that the number rose to 32% among Trump-supporting Republicans.

==== Pastel QAnon ====
Pastel QAnon, identified by Concordia University researcher Marc-André Argentino, is a collection of techniques aimed predominantly at indoctrinating women into the conspiracy theory, mainly on social media sites like Instagram, Facebook, Telegram and YouTube. It co-opts the aesthetics and language of social media influencers, often using personal anecdotes and gateway issues (i child sex-trafficking) to frame QAnon beliefs as reasonable.

=== Post-2020 election ===
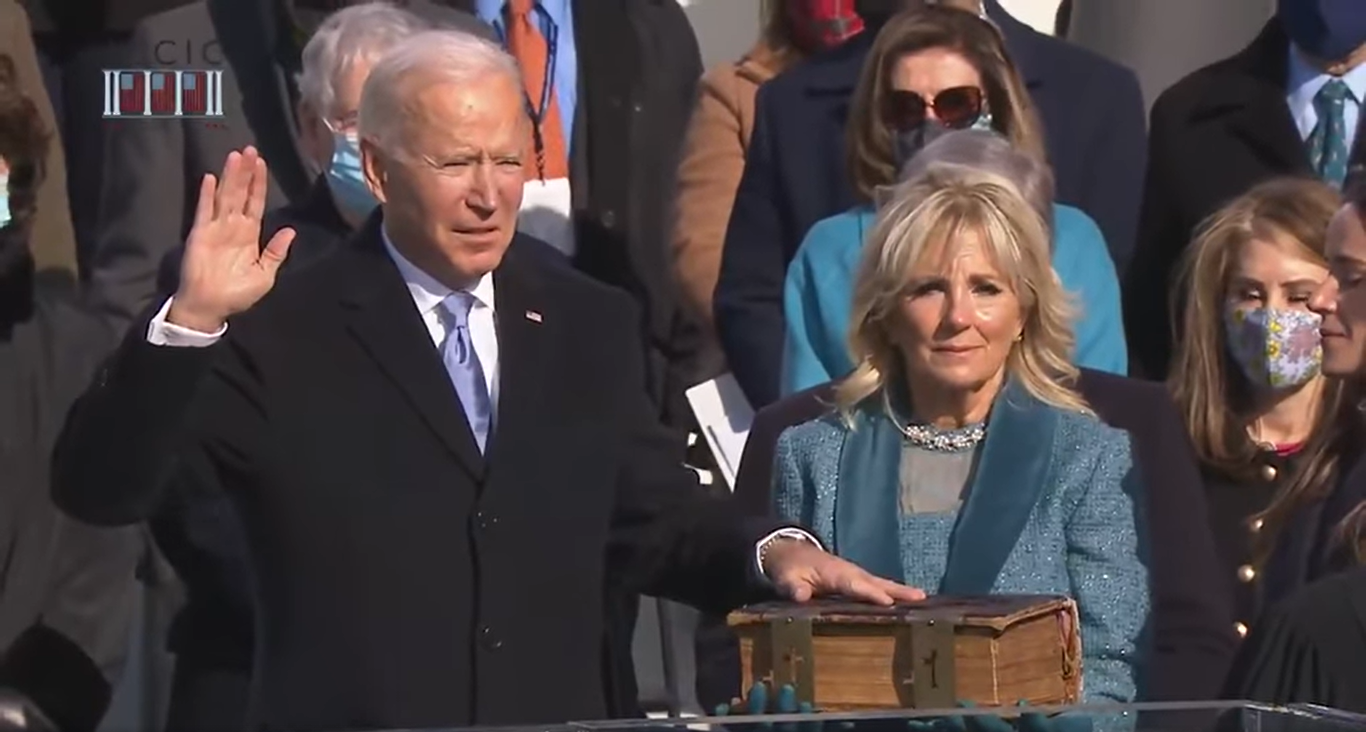
Joe Biden's inauguration went against the expectations of QAnon followers, leading to the disillusionment of many.

After Trump lost the 2020 election, the rate of Q's posts sharply declined and Q stopped posting altogether one month later. The last "drop" for 18 months was on December 8, 2020. Mike Rothschild, author of a book on QAnon, said in 2021 that he doubted Q would ever come back, as the movement had "outgrown the need for new drops" and Trump's election loss had invalidated the core QAnon prophecy, but he added that Q might resume posting if "the community really needed new drops to keep it moving forward".

The inauguration of Joe Biden as president was a major disappointment for QAnon followers, who were convinced that Biden had won the election through voter fraud and his victory would be invalidated. Many QAnon adherents believed that something momentous would happen during the ceremony, and Trump would remain in power. The inauguration ultimately went on as planned. According to a book on the psychology of QAnon followers, Pastels and Pedophiles: Inside the Mind of QAnon, "The inauguration was a particularly difficult prophecy to get wrong, and the result has been that some QAnon believers experienced deep melancholy, suicidal ideation, or engaged in self-harm". On inauguration day, Ron Watkins wrote in a message board post: "We gave it our all, now we need to keep our chins up and go back to our lives as best we are able. We have a new president sworn in and it is our responsibility to respect the Constitution." Other QAnon followers believed Biden's inauguration was "part of the plan". (Note: Some thought that Biden's inauguration was pre-recorded, with Trump being sworn in as President in a secret ceremony away from the cameras. Others thought that the inauguration was illegitimate because Biden was sworn in on a leather-bound bible (which Q supporters incorrectly say meant he didn't actually swear on the Bible), or that the Bible he was sworn in on was related to the Freemasons or the Illuminati in preparation for a New World Order (it was actually a Catholic Bible). Others thought the inauguration was legitimate, a part of a ruse by Trump to entrap Biden and the deep state. Some posited that Trump would actually rule as "shadow President" during Biden's term, and others that Biden had been part of QAnon all along and would be the one bringing down the cabal. Many focused on the idea that there were 17 flags on the dais that Trump gave his farewell address on, and the fact that Q is the 17th letter of the alphabet.)

Conservatives such as Steve Bannon and Bill Still denounced QAnon, calling it a psyop created by U.S. intelligence or the FBI. In a leaked conversation, Michael Flynn, once among the highest-profile QAnon supporters, called it a "disinformation campaign to make people look like a bunch of kooks", suggesting that it might have been conducted by "the Left" or the CIA.

After Biden's inauguration, analysts expressed concern that the disillusionment could lead hardline QAnon adherents to be recruited by groups such as the alt-right, white nationalists or neo-Nazis.

Around 2020–2021, a group of Telegram channels called the Sabmyk Network promoted a variation of QAnon by targeting followers of the conspiracy theory who have been disillusioned by Q's failures in prediction. The network (described as a new religion or cult) shared QAnon beliefs but also expressed belief in a leader-prophet, Sabmyk, who would lead humanity's "awakening". The network also tried to link Trump to Sabmyk. In March 2021, German artist Sebastian Bieniek was identified as the creator of Sabmyk. The next month, Bieniek admitted that the whole network had been a social media experiment, conceived both as an "art project" and a "game".

On June 24, 2022, Q, or someone who possesses their details, posted on 8kun after an 18-month hiatus. The post claimed that Cassidy Hutchinson, who testified at the sixth public hearing on the January 6 Attack, was involved in a plot to disparage Trump. Other Q posts were published in 2022, notably one suggesting that the midterm elections would be rigged, but these messages received much less engagement than previous "drops". An article in Vice News suggested that this showed the QAnon movement had "moved past requiring new Q drops to bolster itself": journalists Mack Lamoureux and David Gilbert commented that during Q's absence, the QAnon community had continued formulating theories and other influencers had "stepped into the power vacuum". As a result, conspiracy theories had continued influencing public discourse, while conservative politics and media became infused with a "more watered-down version of QAnon".

Commenting in 2022 on the influence of QAnon on public discourses, social scientist Donald Moynihan said that "the most vivid importation of the QAnon worldview" was the use of the term groomers and other phrases associated with the LGBT grooming conspiracy theory. He accused Christopher Rufo, one of its main promoters, of having "construct[ed] a new moral panic using QAnon messaging", which he likened to "the McCarthyite tactic of attaching a negative label" (in that case, pedophilia) to "people holding different beliefs".

As of 2024, QAnon adherents are still active online. They rejoiced at Donald Trump's return to power. According to Mike Rothschild, even though there seems to be less interest than before in content analyzing Q's "drops", ideas that QAnon helped popularize, such as the need to confront an evil "deep state" or anti-vaccine conspiracy theories, have become commonplace on the right. Rothschild commented that "QAnon as a movement based around secret codes and clues and riddles doesn't so much exist anymore. But it doesn't need to exist anymore because its tenets have become such a major part of mainstream conservatism and such a big part of the base of people that reelected Donald Trump".

== Incidents ==
QAnon's followers have been part of controversial, sometimes violent events. In 2020, QAnon followers were involved in the presidential election, during which they supported Trump's campaign. QAnon personalities moved to dedicated message boards, where they organized to wage information warfare to influence the election. One in 50 tweets about voting in the 2020 United States presidential election came from QAnon accounts. Two in 25 accounts using the hashtag #voterfraud, which spread unsubstantiated allegations of voting fraud, were QAnon accounts.

=== Vandalism of America's Stonehenge ===
In 2019, the tourist attraction and archaeological site America's Stonehenge was vandalized with power tools. On March 4, 2021, New Hampshire State Police arrested Mark L. Russo, a member of QAnon, and charged him with criminal mischief. Two inscriptions were etched into the so-called "sacrificial table": the QAnon slogan WWG1WGA meaning "Where we go one, we go all" and IAMMARK, Russo's Twitter handle. By using a pseudonym to search social media, researcher Chris Walters found photographs showing the site as well as items later found by the police. Later it was determined that two QAnon followers had had adult sons who had died. Both believed that the "sacrifical table" was real and that their sons had been killed by a worldwide conspiracy led by Hillary Clinton in order to extract adrenochrome, which they believed could renew life.

=== Attempts to overturn the 2020 U.S. election ===
QAnon followers supported the efforts of Trump's legal team to overturn the election through multiple lawsuits and submitted conspiracy theories of their own. They theorized that voting machines made by Dominion Voting Systems had deleted millions of votes for Trump. This was repeated on the far-right cable news outlet One America News Network, and Trump tweeted the segment to his followers.

One specific QAnon-affiliated conspiracy theory, known as Italygate and pushed in the last weeks of Trump's presidency, alleged that the American election had been rigged using technology from the United States Embassy in Rome with the help of an Italian hacker, an Italian general and the Vatican.

Several elected leaders, including Congresswoman Marjorie Taylor Greene and Arizona House Election Chairwoman Kelly Townsend were well known QAnon adherents before the 2020 election and who helped lead attempts to overturn the election in the aftermath. In June 2020, Townsend posted a QAnon video with a flaming "Q" to her social media and followed high-profile QAnon accounts. Some local Arizona politics reporters have referred to Townsend as the QAnon Queen of the Legislature.

Based on a misinterpretation of the District of Columbia Organic Act of 1871 by the sovereign citizen movement, according to which it transformed the federal government into a corporation and rendered illegitimate every president elected thereafter, some QAnon followers claimed that the 18th president (Ulysses S. Grant, in office from 1869 to 1877) was the last legitimate president. They believed that Trump would be sworn in as the 19th president on March 4, 2021. The original inauguration date until the Twentieth Amendment changed it to January 20 in 1933, and that he would restore the federal government. Based on intelligence that an identified but undisclosed militia group might attempt an attack on the Capitol on that date, the U.S. Capitol Police issued an alert on March 3. House leadership subsequently rescheduled a March 4 vote to the previous night to allow lawmakers to leave town.

The Anti-Defamation League, British security firm G4S, and nonpartisan governance watchdog Advance Democracy Inc, studied QAnon posts and warned of the potential for violence on January 6, 2021. Violence did occur that day, as the attempts to overturn the election culminated with the attack on the U.S. Capitol. Multiple QAnon-affiliated protesters participated in the disturbance. Rioters were either seen wearing clothing with Q-related emblems or identified as QAnon followers from video footage. One participant whose attire and behavior attracted worldwide media attention was Jake Angeli, a QAnon supporter nicknamed the "QAnon Shaman". Ashli Babbitt, a rioter who was shot dead by police as she was trying to break into the Speaker's Lobby, was a committed follower of QAnon. The day before the attack, she had tweeted: "the storm is here and it is descending upon DC in less than 24 hours".

The attack led to a crackdown on QAnon content on social media. On April 19, 2021, the Soufan Center reported that Russia and China had amplified and "weaponized" QAnon at the time of the Capitol attack "to sow societal discord and even compromise legitimate political processes."

=== German coup attempt ===
Several QAnon adherents were charged with participation in the 2022 coup d'état plot in Germany, which involved groups of far-right activists and conspiracy theorists, such as the Reichsbürger movement.

== Reactions ==
=== Media, advocacy groups, and public figures ===
Journalists have debunked QAnon's basic tenets. In 2018, The Washington Post called its proponents "a deranged conspiracy cult" and "some of the Internet's most outré Trump fans".

Russian government-funded state media such as RT and Sputnik amplified the conspiracy theory, lending credibility to some of its theses and citing QAnon as evidence that the United States is divided by internal strife. On March 13, 2018, Cheryl Sullenger, vice president of the anti-abortion group Operation Rescue, called QAnon a "small group of insiders close to President Donald J. Trump" and called their posts the "highest level of intelligence to ever be dropped publicly in our known history". On March 15, Kyiv-based Rabochaya Gazeta, the official newspaper of the Communist Party of Ukraine, published an article calling QAnon a "military intelligence group". On March 31, actor Roseanne Barr appeared to promote QAnon, covered by CNN, The Washington Post, and The New York Times. Radio talk show host Lionel became an outspoken QAnon supporter. In April and October 2021, actor Jim Caviezel appeared at conservative conferences and endorsed aspects of the QAnon.

In June 2018, a Time magazine article listed Q among the 25 Most Influential People on the Internet in 2018. Counting more than 130,000 related discussion videos on YouTube, Time cited the wide range of the conspiracy theory and its more prominent followers and news coverage. On July 4, the Hillsborough County Republican Party shared on its official Facebook and Twitter accounts a YouTube video on QAnon, calling them a "mysterious anonymous inside leaker of deep state activities and counter activities by President Trump". The posts were soon deleted.

In August 2018, following the presence of QAnon supporters at Trump's Tampa, Florida rally for the midterm elections, MSNBC news anchors Hallie Jackson, Brian Williams, and Chris Hayes dedicated portions of their programs to the conspiracy theory. PBS NewsHour also ran a segment on QAnon the next day. In August, Washington Post editorial writer Molly Roberts wrote, "'The storm' QAnon truthers predict will never strike because the conspiracy that obsesses them doesn't exist. But while they wait for it, they'll try to whip up the winds, and the rest of us will struggle to find shelter."

=== Official responses ===
==== FBI domestic terrorism assessment ====
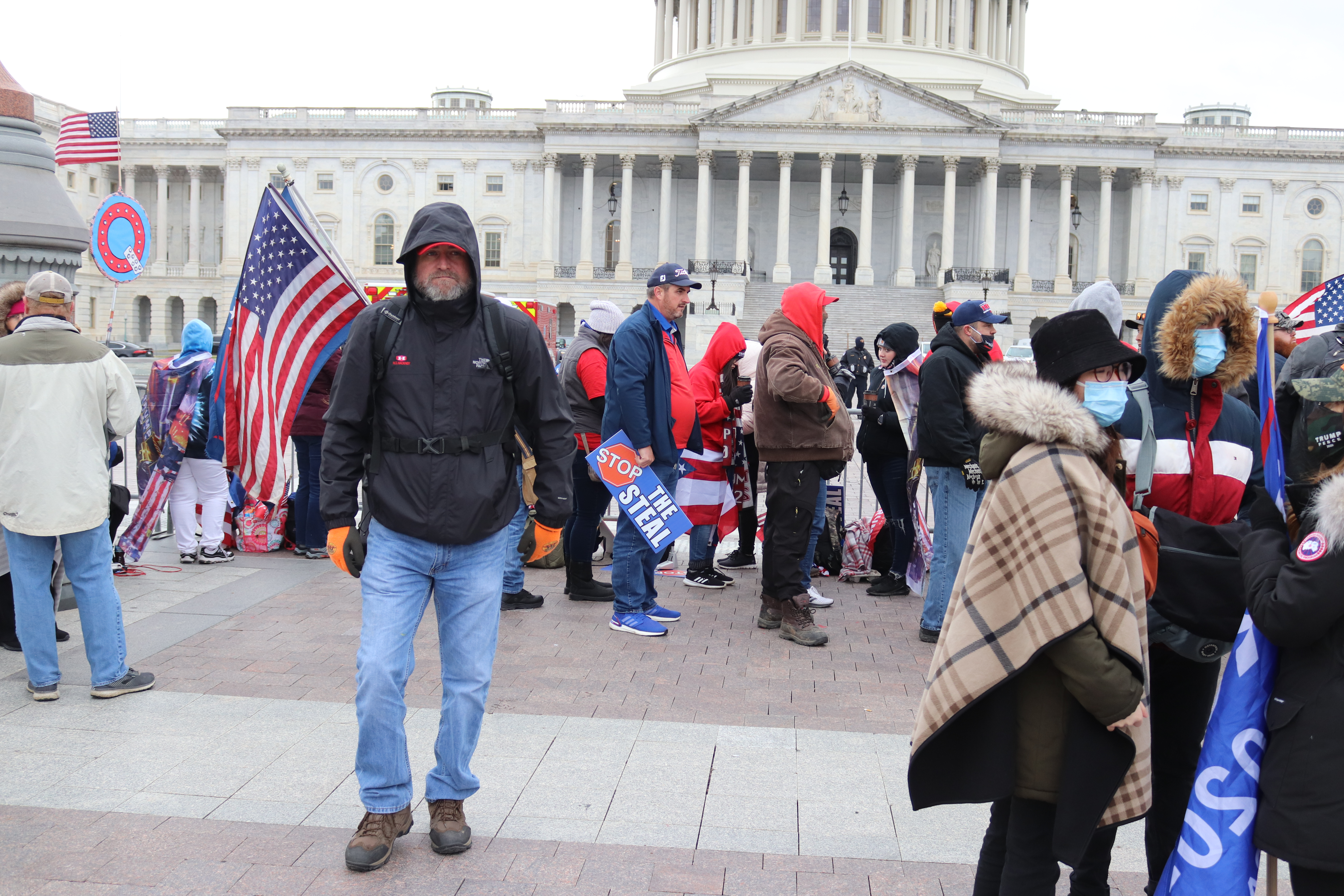
A QAnon emblem (upper left) being raised on Capitol grounds on January 6, 2021, shortly before the building was stormed

In May 2019, an FBI "Intelligence Bulletin" memo from the Phoenix field office identified QAnon-driven extremists as a domestic terrorism threat. The document cited arrests related to QAnon, some of which had not been publicized before. According to the memo, "This is the first FBI product examining the threat from conspiracy theory-driven domestic extremists and provides a baseline for future intelligence products. ... The FBI assesses these conspiracy theories very likely will emerge, spread, and evolve in the modern information marketplace, occasionally driving both groups and individual extremists to carry out criminal or violent acts."

According to FBI's counterterrorism director Michael G. McGarrity's testimony before Congress in May, the FBI divides domestic terrorism threats into four primary categories, "racially motivated violent extremism, anti-government/anti-authority extremism, animal rights/environmental extremism, and abortion extremism", which includes both abortion-rights and anti-abortion extremists. The fringe conspiracy theory threat is closely related to the anti-government/anti-authority subject area. On December 19, 2018, a Californian man whose car contained bomb-making materials he intended to use to "blow up a satanic temple monument" in the Springfield, Illinois, Capitol rotunda to "make Americans aware of Pizzagate and the New World Order, who were dismantling society" was arrested. The FBI said another factor driving the intensity of anti-government extremism is "the uncovering of real conspiracies or cover-ups involving illegal, harmful, or unconstitutional activities by government officials or leading political figures".

==== Congressional resolution ====
In August 2020, two U.S. Representatives, Democrat Tom Malinowski and Republican Denver Riggleman, introduced a bipartisan simple resolution (H. Res. 1154) condemning QAnon. Malinowski said the resolution's aim was to repudiate "this dangerous, anti-Semitic, conspiracy-mongering cult that the FBI says is radicalizing Americans to violence". The resolution urged law enforcement and homeland security agencies "to continue to strengthen their focus on preventing violence, threats, harassment, and other criminal activity by extremists motivated by fringe political conspiracy theories" and encouraged the U.S. intelligence community "to uncover any foreign support, assistance, or online amplification QAnon receives, as well as any QAnon affiliations, coordination, and contacts with foreign extremist organizations or groups espousing violence".

In September 2020, Malinowski received death threats from QAnon followers after being falsely accused of wanting to protect sexual predators. The threats were prompted by a National Republican Congressional Committee (NRCC) campaign advertisement that falsely claimed that Malinowski worked against plans to increase registration for sex offenders in a 2006 crime bill while he was working as a lobbyist for Human Rights Watch.

The resolution passed on October 2, 2020, in a 371–18 vote. Seventeen Republicans (including Steve King, Paul Gosar, and Daniel Webster) and one independent (Justin Amash) voted no; Republican Andy Harris voted "present". According to Will Sommer in The Daily Beast, the resolution does not have the force of law. Before the vote, Malinowski told Slate magazine, referencing the NRCC ad: "I don't want to see any Republicans voting against fire on the House floor this week and then continuing to play with fire next week by running these kinds of ads against Democratic candidates."

=== Republican individuals and organizations ===
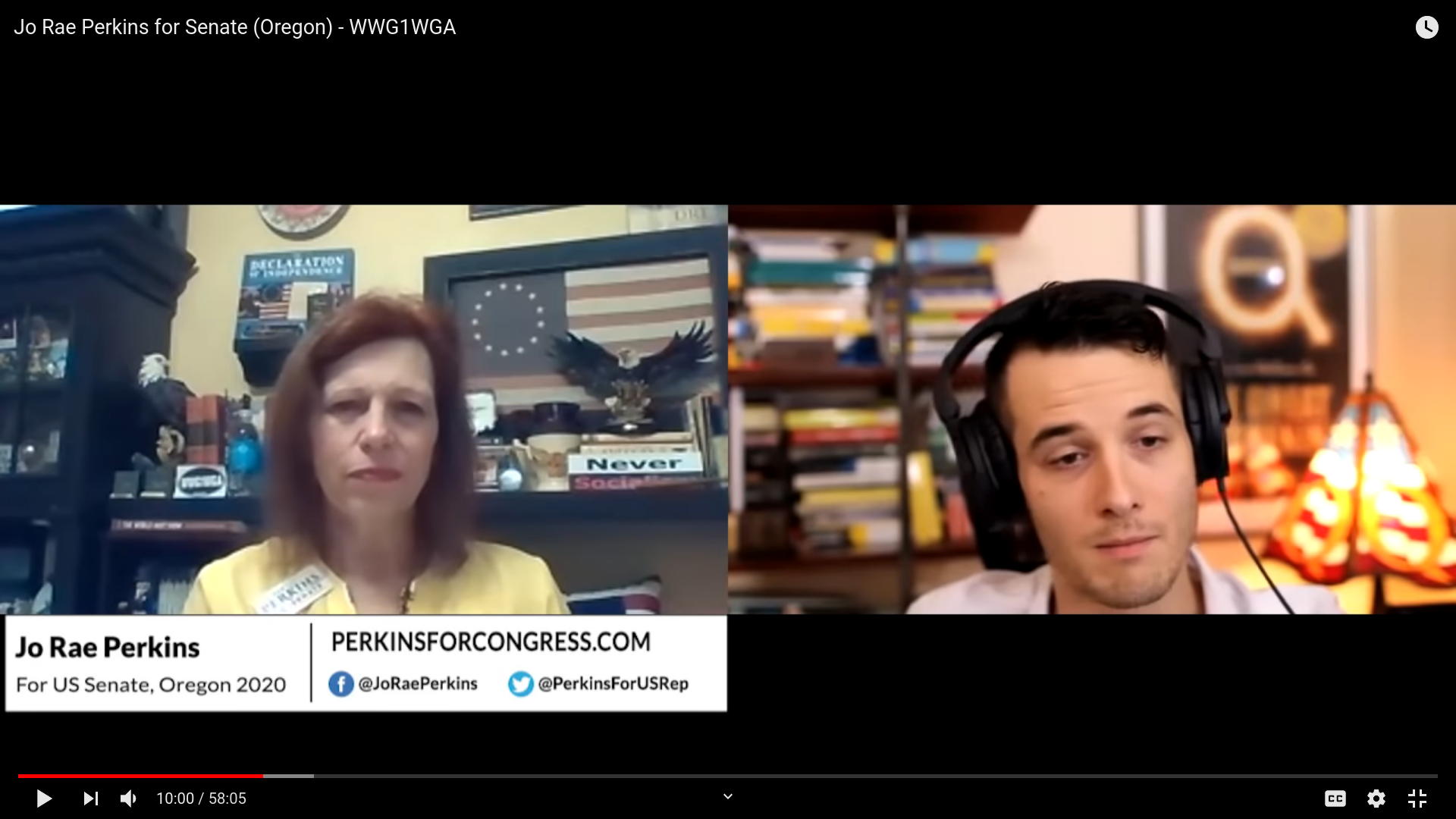
Jo Rae Perkins, Republican nominee for the 2020 United States Senate election in Oregon, being interviewed by QAnon influencer Dustin Nemos

In 2019, two Republican congressional candidates expressed support for QAnon theories. In early 2020, Jim Watkins created the "Disarm the Deep State" super PAC, whose stated aim was to "mobilize a community of patriots in order to remove power from Deep State members". In November 2020, it was reported that the PAC had raised just $4,736, including a $500 loan from Watkins's lawyer.

In 2020, there were 97 QAnon followers in the primaries, of whom 22 Republicans and two independents ran in the elections of that year. Businesswoman Marjorie Taylor Greene won an August 2020 runoff to become the GOP nominee in the 14th Congressional District in Georgia. In 2020, she said many of Q's claims "have really proven to be true". Months into the Trump presidency, she stated in a video: "There's a once-in-a-lifetime opportunity to take this global cabal of Satan-worshiping pedophiles out, and I think we have the president to do it". Jo Rae Perkins, the 2020 Republican Senate candidate in Oregon, tweeted a video on the night of her May primary victory showing her holding a WWG1WGA sticker and stating that she "[stood] with Q and the team. Thank you Anons, and thank you patriots." She expressed regret at having later deleted the video on the advice of a political consultant. The next month she took the "digital soldiers oath" that Q had requested followers to do three days earlier.

On June 30, 2020, incumbent Republican U.S. representative Scott Tipton lost a primary for Colorado's 3rd congressional district to Lauren Boebert in an upset. Boebert expressed tentative support for QAnon in an interview, but after winning the primary, attempted to distance herself from those statements, saying "I'm not a follower." Boebert was elected to Congress that November. Angela Stanton-King, a Trump-backed candidate running for the Georgia House seat of the late congressman John Lewis, posted on Twitter that Black Lives Matter is "a major cover up for pedophilia and human trafficking" and "the storm is here". Stanton-King told a reporter that her posts did not relate to QAnon, asserting, "It was raining that day." Weather records did not show precipitation in her area on the day of the post.

In August 2020, The New York Times said that the Texas Republican Party's new slogan ("We Are the Storm") was taken from Q. Texas Republican Party officials denied this, saying it was inspired by a biblical passage and has no connection to QAnon. In May 2021, representative Louie Gohmert and Texas Republican Party chairman Allen West attended the "For God & Country: Patriot Roundup" conference organized by QAnon followers in Dallas.

Also in August 2020, representative Liz Cheney became the highest-ranking House Republican to take a stand against QAnon, which she called a "dangerous lunacy that should have no place in American politics". Other Republican Party members who have spoken out against QAnon include senator Ben Sasse, former Florida governor Jeb Bush and senator and former presidential candidate Mitt Romney. In March 2021, representative Peter Meijer said that the Republican Party should unequivocally condemn QAnon and other conspiracy theories, and commented: "The fact that a significant plurality, if not potentially a majority, of our voters have been deceived into this creation of an alternate reality could very well be an existential threat to the party". Representative Adam Kinzinger launched a PAC called "Country First", aimed at countering conspiracy theories and Donald Trump.

In April 2024, the Washington Post published an article saying that since 2021 QAnon had "mostly evaporated" after Q stopped posting new messages, but that the movement and its worldview had "largely been folded into the broader Republican Party".

==== Donald Trump ====
According to Media Matters for America, as of August 2020, Trump had amplified QAnon messaging at least 216 times by retweeting or mentioning 129 QAnon-affiliated Twitter accounts, sometimes multiple times a day. QAnon followers came to refer to Trump as "Q+". On August 24, 2018, Trump hosted Michael William "Lionel" Lebron, a leading QAnon promoter, in the Oval Office for a photo op. Shortly after Christmas 2019, Trump retweeted over a dozen QAnon followers.

On August 19, 2020, Trump was asked about QAnon during a press conference; he replied: "I don't know much about the movement, other than I understand they like me very much, which I appreciate." An FBI Field Office in Phoenix has called QAnon a potential domestic terror threat, but Trump called QAnon followers "people who love our country". When a reporter asked Trump if he could support a notion that suggests he "is secretly saving the world from this satanic cult of pedophiles and cannibals", he responded: "Well, I haven't heard that, but is that supposed to be a bad thing or a good thing?" Presidential candidate Joe Biden responded that Trump was aiming to "legitimize a conspiracy theory that the FBI has identified as a domestic terrorism threat".

On October 15, 2020, when given the opportunity to denounce QAnon at a "town hall"-style campaign event, Trump refused to do so and instead pointed out that QAnon opposes pedophilia. He said he knew nothing else about QAnon and told his questioner, Savannah Guthrie of NBC News, that no one can know whether the premise of QAnon's conspiracy theory is true. "They believe it is a satanic cult run by the deep state," Guthrie informed him. When Guthrie asserted that the conspiracy was not true, Trump responded, "No, I don't know that. And neither do you know that."

In September 2022, an Associated Press analysis found that Trump was embracing QAnon more openly than before. Trump was reposting Q drops and QAnon memes on Truth Social, and more than a third of the accounts he had reposted in the last month had themselves shared QAnon slogans, videos or imagery. Trump has played the song Mirrors at public events. The song has been associated with QAnon since it was re-published as WWG1WGA by a YouTube user named "Richard Feelgood". The song's author, Will van de Crommert, has disavowed Trump and QAnon.

==== Mike Pence ====
On August 21, 2020, Vice President Mike Pence said that he did not "know anything about" QAnon except that it was a conspiracy theory that he "dismisse[d] out of hand". When asked whether he would acknowledge the administration's role in "giving oxygen" to the belief, Pence shook his head and said, "Give me a break." Pence also commented that the media giving attention to QAnon amounted to "[chasing] shiny objects".

After the election, as the date of the 2021 United States Electoral College vote count approached and Pence showed no intention of blocking the certification of Biden's win, QAnon figures vilified him as a traitor. After Pence's lawyers fought a lawsuit that aimed to make him refuse to count electoral votes for Biden, Lin Wood said that Pence would "face execution by firing squad" for "treason". A few hours before the count started on January 6, Wood tweeted that Pence should resign immediately and that charges should be brought against him. Following the attack on the Capitol, Wood called Pence a "child molester" on Twitter. After his Twitter account was suspended, Wood used Parler to call again for Pence's execution by firing squad.

==== Michael Flynn ====
Former lieutenant general and head of the Defense Intelligence Agency Michael Flynn, who served as Trump's National Security Advisor, became popular among QAnon followers, who took a 2016 quote from Flynn about Trump having been elected by an "army of digital soldiers" and started calling themselves "digital soldiers". QAnon followers also adopted three stars as a symbol to display solidarity with Flynn, as a reference to Flynn having been a three-star general in the U.S. army.

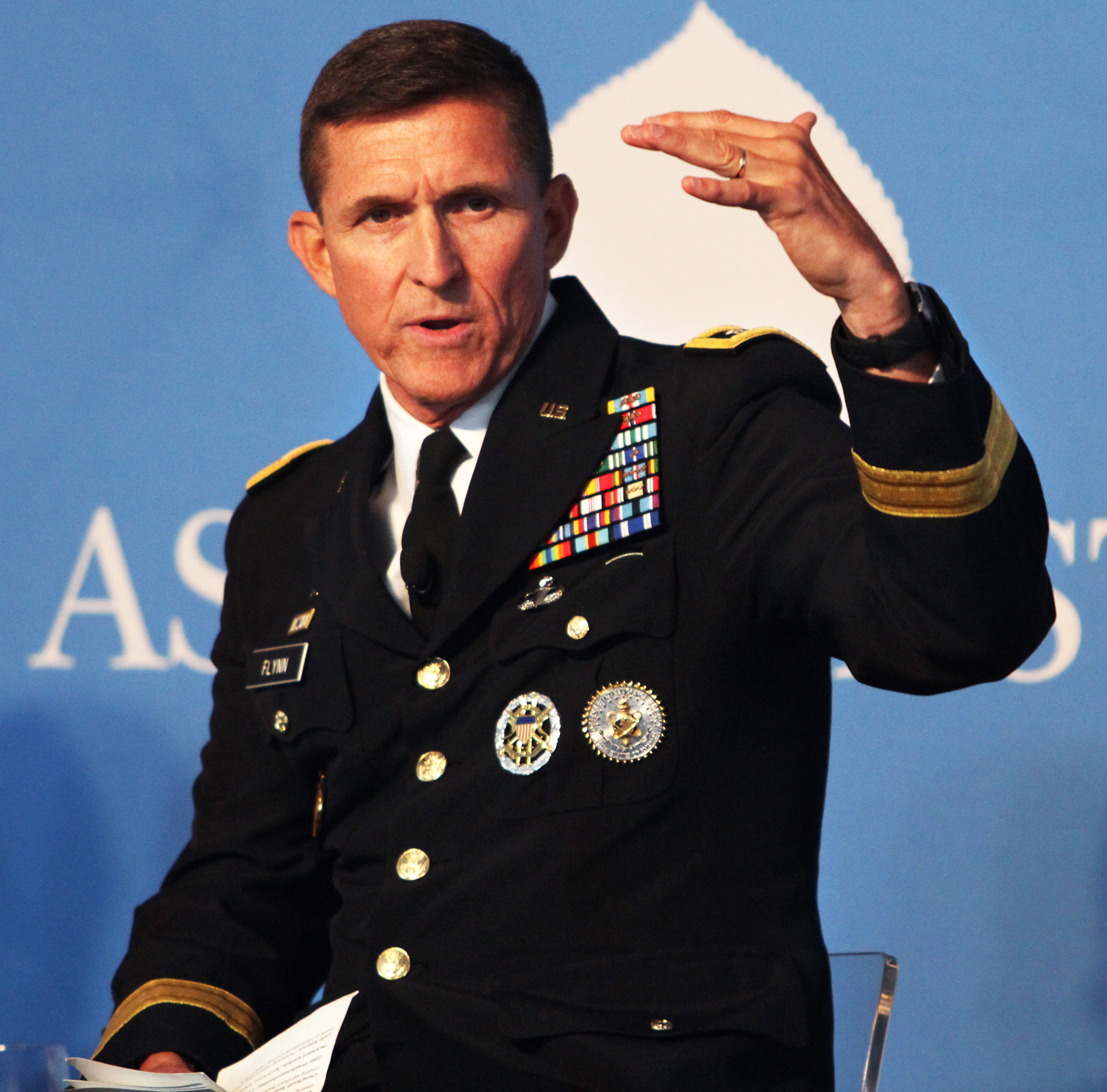
Michael Flynn was one of QAnon's most high-profile promoters, before appearing to reject the conspiracy theory in late 2021.

In August 2019, a "Digital Soldiers Conference" was announced for the next month in Atlanta. The stated purpose was to prepare "patriotic social media warriors" for a coming "digital civil war" against "censorship and suppression". The announcement of the event prominently displayed a Q spelled in stars on the blue field of an American flag, with the three stars making up the tail of the "Q" being highlighted separately to reference Flynn's military status. Scheduled speakers for the event, which was hosted by Yippy CEO Rich Granville, included Flynn and George Papadopoulos, as well as Gina Loudon, a Trump friend and member of his campaign media advisory board, singer Joy Villa, and Bill Mitchell, a radio host and ardent Trump supporter.

On July 4, 2020, Flynn posted to his Twitter account a video of himself leading a small group in an oath with the QAnon motto, "Where we go one, we go all". Analysts said the oath was part of QAnon's attempt to organize "digital soldiers" for the political and social apocalypse they see coming. Flynn's apparent declaration of allegiance to QAnon made him the most prominent former government official to endorse the conspiracy theory. Member of Trump's legal team and Flynn's representative Sidney Powell denied that the oath was related to QAnon. (Note: She said it was engraved on a bell on John F. Kennedy's sailboat. This is not true, although the quote has been attributed to Kennedy by Q. Kennedy's sailboat, Victura, did not have a bell, and the phrase does not appear on the Kennedy family's yacht, the Honey Fitz. The phrase is shown on a boat in the 1996 movie White Squall, and screenshots from this movie have been spread by QAnon followers as supposed proof of their claims.) During the preceding days, numerous QAnon followers took the same "digital soldier oath" on Twitter, and used the same #TakeTheOath hashtag Flynn did.

After his November 2020 pardon and the election results, Flynn became more closely associated with QAnon, endorsing a website that sold QAnon merchandise, creating a Digital Soldiers media company, and saying he planned to launch a news media outlet also called "Digital soldiers". He appeared on various far-right media, pushing QAnon-affiliated conspiracy theories. Flynn's activism fueled speculation among QAnon followers that he would help them take control, or that he was Q himself. QAnon supporters expressed their commitment in social media posts by using the phrase "Fight like a Flynn" or variations thereof.

A QAnon flag based on the Betsy Ross flag, similar to the one used to advertise the aforementioned "Digital Soldiers Conference"

In February 2021, several weeks after the Capitol riot, Flynn distanced himself from QAnon theories by saying in an interview: "There's no plan. There's so many people out there asking, 'Is the plan happening?' We have what we have, and we have to accept the situation as it is." But he did not outright disavow the QAnon movement. In May 2021, Flynn was a keynote speaker at the "For God & Country: Patriot Roundup" conference organized in Dallas, Texas by QAnon influencer John Sabal. At the end of the year, though, Flynn appeared to have rejected QAnon as a whole.

In March 2021, Flynn's brother, retired lieutenant general Jack Flynn, and his wife filed a $75 million defamation suit against CNN, alleging the network had falsely accused them of being QAnon followers. They asserted that the video Flynn had posted in July 2020, which CNN had broadcast, depicted their pledging an oath to the Constitution, not to QAnon. The suit claimed Flynn alone had recited the QAnon motto, "where we go one, we go all", though the video showed all the other participants had done so. The plaintiffs also said they "are not followers or supporters of any extremist or terrorist groups, including QAnon". In December 2021, federal district court judge Gregory Howard Woods largely rejected CNN's motion to dismiss the case, allowing it to proceed to determine whether the Flynns had been portrayed in a false light.

==== Lin Wood ====
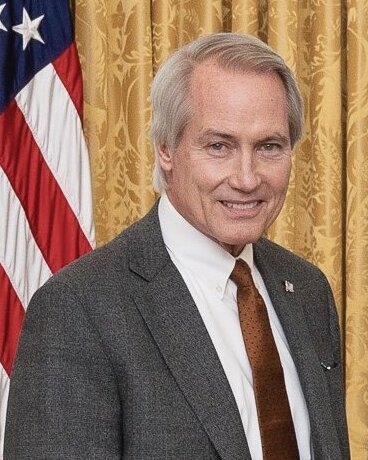
Lawyer Lin Wood promoted QAnon and other conspiracy theories as part of his attempts to overturn the election and discredit Supreme Court justices.

Lin Wood, a lawyer who worked with Trump's reelection campaign and participated in the election lawsuits, promoted QAnon conspiracy theories. His Twitter profile included the hashtag #WWG1WGA, a slogan associated with QAnon. Among other baseless QAnon-associated claims, he accused Chief Justice John Roberts of child rape and murder. Wood also claimed that QAnon supporter Isaac Kappy was murdered for attempting to transmit information to Trump. On January 11, 2021, Delaware Superior Court Judge Craig A. Karsnitz cited Wood's social media postings in his reasons for an order revoking Wood's right to appear before the court. Karsnitz said that he had "no doubt" that Wood's tweets played a role in inciting the attack on the Capitol.

==== Sidney Powell ====
Attorney Sidney Powell, a member of Trump's legal team, denied knowledge of QAnon in January 2020, though in the following months she retweeted major QAnon accounts and catchphrases and appeared on QAnon channels on YouTube.

After leaving Trump's team, Powell remained involved in post-election lawsuits and was embraced by QAnon followers, discouraged that predictions of a Trump landslide victory and coming revelations about his enemies had not materialized. Powell's evidence in the lawsuit she filed in Georgia to overturn the election result included an affidavit from Ron Watkins. In this document, Watkins stated that his reading of an online user guide for Dominion Voting Systems software led him to conclude that election fraud might be "within the realm of possibility". Watkins did not provide any evidence of fraud.

In May 2021, Powell asserted that Trump "can simply be reinstated", that "a new inauguration date is set". The date for this was supposedly August 13 of the same year.

==== Kelly Townsend ====
Former Arizona State Senator Kelly Townsend is a longtime conspiracy theorist, feeding conspiracies such as the Obama birther conspiracy to Trump before he was elected. She posted the QAnon "Q" symbol to her social media account in 2018 and has consistently aligned with QAnon theories, including calling all vaccines "communist". In 2021, Townsend supported activists active in the election denial movement in a spirit similar to the events that occurred at the U.S. Capitol on January 6, 2021, urging parents to take control of school board meetings related to COVID-19 restrictions and mask mandates. Throughout the process of securing the Arizona audit conducted by QAnon conspiracy theorist Doug Logan from Cyber Ninjas, Townsend worked closely with QAnon adherent Liz Harris, who rented one of her condos to QAnon board owner Ron Watkins so he could run for office in Arizona in 2022.

Along with Roger Stone associate Jerome Corsi, Sheriff Joe Arpaio, and 2020 Maricopa County Sheriff candidate and then chief Arpaio staffer Jerry Sheridan, Townsend worked with informant Dennis Montgomery. In 2020, she worked with Corsi again, claiming the 2020 election was stolen from Trump and emailing Corsi a document of Arizona senators endorsing Trump electors in an attempt to overturn the 2020 election. In the lead-up to January 6, 2021, Townsend sponsored a bill that would designate Trump electors from Arizona and promoted the Arizona audit and stolen election claims.

==== Liz Harris ====
When Ron Watkins, son of Jim Watkins, who owned the image board that QAnon posts were posted on, came to the U.S. from Japan to run for Congress, he listed a property owned by Liz Harris who is also a prominent QAnon influencer, as his primary address. After QAnon supporter Kelly Townsend was voted out of office in Arizona during the 2022 midterms, Harris was elected for a short time before being expelled for lying during an ethics investigation that was investigating her for promotion of conspiracies.

==== Kash Patel ====
Kash Patel, the director of the Federal Bureau of Investigation, has appeared on more than 50 podcasts that have promoted or shared QAnon-related content. In 2022, while serving on Truth Social's board, Patel said the platform was trying to "incorporate" QAnon "into our overall messaging scheme to capture audiences." He has signed copies of his children's book with the QAnon slogan "WWG1WGA" and promoted the hashtag on Truth Social.

== Online ==
=== QDrops app ===
QDrops, an app that promoted the conspiracy theory, was published on the Apple App Store and Google Play. It became the most popular paid app in Apple's online store's "entertainment" section in April 2018, and the tenth-most popular paid app overall. It was published by Tiger Team Inc, a North Carolina couple, Richard and Adalita Brown. On July 15, 2018, Apple pulled the app after an inquiry from NBC News.

In mid-May 2020, Google removed three other apps – QMAP, Q Alerts! and Q Alerts LITE – from the Android app store for violating its terms of service.

=== Anti-QAnon subreddits ===
Some social media forums, such as the subreddits r/QAnonCasualties and r/ReQovery, aim to assist either former followers and supporters of QAnon conspiracies or those whose family members engaged in the conspiracy.

=== Removal of content ===
In March 2018, Reddit banned one of its communities discussing QAnon, /r/CBTS_Stream, for "encouraging or inciting violence and posting personal and confidential information". Some followers moved to Discord. Several other communities were formed for discussion of QAnon, leading to further bans on September 12, 2018, in response to these communities "inciting violence, harassment, and the dissemination of personal information", which led to thousands of followers regrouping on Voat, a Switzerland-based Reddit clone that has been described as a hub for the alt-right. In early 2019, Twitter removed accounts suspected of being connected to the Russian Internet Research Agency that had disseminated a high volume of QAnon-related tweets that used the #WWG1WGA slogan.

In May 2020, Facebook announced its removal of five pages, 20 accounts, and six groups linked to "individuals associated with the QAnon network" as part of an investigation into "suspected coordinated inauthentic behavior" ahead of the 2020 United States election. On August 19, Facebook expanded its Dangerous Individuals and Organizations policy to address "growing movements that, while not directly organizing violence, have celebrated violent acts, shown that they have weapons and suggest they will use them, or have individual followers with patterns of violent behavior". As a result of this increased vigilance, Facebook reported having already "removed over 790 groups, 100 Pages and 1,500 ads tied to QAnon from Facebook, blocked over 300 hashtags across Facebook and Instagram, and additionally imposed restrictions on over 1,950 Groups and 440 Pages on Facebook and over 10,000 accounts on Instagram". In the month after its August announcement, Facebook said it deleted 1,500 QAnon groups; such groups by then had four million followers. In October 2020, Facebook said it would immediately begin removing "any Facebook Pages, Groups and Instagram accounts representing QAnon, even if they contain no violent content". The company said it would immediately ban any group representing QAnon.

In July 2020, Twitter announced it was banning more than 7,000 accounts connected to QAnon for coordinated amplification of fake news and conspiracy theories. In a press release, Twitter said, "We've been clear that we will take strong enforcement action on behavior that has the potential to lead to offline harm. In line with this approach, this week we are taking further action on so-called 'QAnon' activity across the service." It also said that the actions could apply to over 150,000 accounts.

Facebook banned all QAnon groups and pages in October 2020. That day, QAnon followers speculated that the action was part of a complex Trump administration strategy to begin arresting its enemies, or that Facebook was attempting to silence news of this occurring; neither is true. Some followers speculated that a Justice Department "national security" news conference scheduled for the next day would relate to charges against Democrats, including Hillary Clinton. The Justice Department actually announced the investigation and arrest of Islamic State members. Etsy also announced that it would remove all QAnon-related merchandise from its online marketplace. The products were still available there as of January 2021.

In an interview with CNN, YouTube CEO Susan Wojcicki said much QAnon material was "borderline content" that did not explicitly break its rules, but that changes in the site's methodology for recommendations had reduced views of QAnon-related content by 80%. Three days later, YouTube announced that it had modified its hate and harassment policies to bar "content that targets an individual or group with conspiracy theories that have been used to justify real-world violence", such as QAnon and Pizzagate. It would still allow content discussing QAnon if it did not target individuals.

Hashtags and accounts associated with QAnon have since been banned by numerous social networks including Facebook, Twitter, TikTok, and Instagram. In particular, the 2021 United States Capitol attack led to a crackdown on QAnon-related content on social media platforms during the days that followed. Twitter suspended Lin Wood's account on January 7 and those of Sidney Powell, Michael Flynn and other high-profile QAnon figures the next day. On January 12, Facebook and Twitter announced that they were removing "Stop the Steal" content and suspending 70,000 QAnon-focused accounts, respectively. More waves of deletions followed on various platforms. Amazon removed a pro-QAnon book after the Capitol riots, and many platforms took action against QAnon-related content after the incident. In May 2021, a report published by the Atlantic Council concluded that QAnon content was "evaporating" from the mainstream web.

=== Migration to alt-tech ===
The mass deletions of QAnon-related accounts on the most popular social media outlets led many members of the movement to migrate to alt-tech platforms. Notably, Parler grew in popularity among QAnon followers and conservatives in general in early 2021. (Note: A lot of Parler's content related to QAnon or far-right extremist ideologies, and it was taken down by Amazon Web Services in the days following the Capitol attack. Although mentions of QAnon or related hashtags on Parler were lower than mainstream platforms' slowest days, Parler conversations were less critical of the movement, and tended to focus on support for Trump.) Gab also became increasingly popular in these environments, especially after Parler went offline for several weeks following the Capitol attack.

In the course of 2021, various alt-tech platforms allowed QAnon influencers and adherents to regroup, with Gab and Telegram becoming particularly important hubs of QAnon communities.

=== Return to Twitter/X ===
In April 2022, QAnon followers celebrated Elon Musk's proposed purchase of Twitter, believing that Musk's free speech approach would allow them back onto the platform. After Musk acquired the platform in October of the same year, various QAnon-related accounts were reinstated and resumed posting about the conspiracy theory. By December the conspiracy theory began to make a comeback on Twitter. Suspected Q author Ron Watkins was subsequently reinstated on the platform in January 2023, while in March Musk defended the "QAnon Shaman" by calling for Jacob Chansley to be freed. In May, the Anti-Defamation League documented a surge of QAnon content on Twitter, now X, described as a resurgence.

== See also ==
- Apophenia, the tendency to perceive connections and meaning between unrelated things
- Cult of personality
- List of conspiracy theories
- Secret decoder ring, a promotional item that taps into a common fascination with secret codes
- Sound of Freedom, 2023 film with alleged ties to the QAnon movement
- "Epstein didn't kill himself"
- Radical Right
- Satanic Panic
- Operation Trust
