= /lgbt/ =

LGBTQ board on 4chan

- Website type: 4chan imageboard
- Available in: English
- Owner: Hiroyuki Nishimura
- Founder: Christopher "moot" Poole
- Website: 4chan.org/lgbt/
- Commercial: Yes
- Registration: Optional
- Launched: March 18, 2013; 13 years ago
- Current status: Online

/lgbt/ is the LGBTQ board on 4chan, an English-language imageboard. Launched on March 18, 2013, it was 4chan's first board devoted to a social issue and the first safe for work board devoted to the LGBTQ community. Due to its predominant transgender demographic, the board has been nicknamed /tttt/.

Common topics include gender identity, transition, politics, and passing. Though much of the discussions on /lgbt/ involve personal advice and support, they also sometimes involve hostility and transphobia directed at other transgender users.

== Background ==
4chan was launched by Christopher "moot" Poole on October 1, 2003. Created as an English-language alternative to Japanese imageboard website Futaba Channel, 4chan is completely anonymous. Users may sign their posts with a tripcode, but there is no registration process. On March 18, 2013, /lgbt/ was created to facilitate "the respectful discussion of LGBT lifestyle and the LGBT community." Since its launch, /lgbt/ has been criticized for potential hate speech. The board's userbase consists of primarily transgender women. The board has been nicknamed /tttt/ because of this majority.

== Criticism ==
Harmful, self-deprecating speech is frequent on /lgbt/, especially from and towards transgender people. The slur "tranny" was found in 2024 by researcher Miro Kotajärvi to be the second most frequent noun used to refer to transgender people on the board since 2016. However, use of the word was found by Kotajärvi to be in a more reclamatory context than a hateful one. /lgbt/ has created its own terms as well, often used in a more pejorative context. One such example is "AGP" (standing for autogynephile); this term was coined in, at the latest, 1989, defined by Ray Blanchard as a man who is "sexually aroused by the fantasy of being a woman." The concept of autogynephilia is generally seen as outdated research. Kotajärvi argues that the definition of "AGP" on /lgbt/ has shifted since Blanchard's research, defined as how /lgbt/ users refer to "sexually perverse, poorly passing transgender women" in Kotajärvi's thesis paper. Another example from Kotajärvi's research is "hon," a term used on /lgbt/ for non-passing (usually "ugly") transgender women. "Hon" is seen in contrast with the term "passoid," a term for a transgender woman who passes well. Kotajärvi argues that these terms are used as hate speech by transgender people against transgender people.

4chan as a whole is known for hate speech. There are multiple examples of pejorative terms against LGBTQ people that have originated from 4chan, such as "clovergender," a fake gender identity defined in the original 4chan post as "a child trapped in a man’s body who is attracted to other children." The slur "fag" is widespread, used to refer to most, if not all, types of people. An example is "oldfag," a term for a user who has been on 4chan for a long time. In 2020, 4chan users launched "Operation Pridefall," a targeted harassment campaign against that year's Pride Month celebration. The gay bar Eagle London ran an online fundraiser event that was flooded with spam messages and forced to shut down.

== Overlap with Reddit ==
4chan and Reddit have been observed to have an overlap in userbase; however, the relationship has grown more distant over time. Researcher Miro Kotajärvi observed that users of the subreddit /r/asktransgender are aware of terms originating on /lgbt/:

On the subreddit r/asktransgender (Reddit, n.d.b), in a discussion thread debating the terminology pertaining to transgender people, a commenter describes the two lemmas, “hon” and “passoid”, with the following words: "I think "passoid" just means a trans person who passes ridiculously well. The opposite of a passoid is a "hon" who is a non-passing transfem but maybe gets told she looks great regardless. "You look great, hon!" And yeah, these are very toxic 4chan trans things... Avoid if you want to maintain your sanity and self-respect." (mouse9001, 2023)

— Miro Kotajärvi, In-group Hate Speech: A Speech Act Theoretical Investigation of Transphobic Hate on 4chan’s Imageboard /lgbt/

Numerous examples of Reddit users discussing /lgbt/ terms, as well as user overlap, can be found across the website. Examples are largely critical.

== See also ==
- /b/
- /mlp/
- /mu/
- /pol/
- /v/
- /x/
