= /x/ =

Paranormal discussion board on 4chan

- Website type: Imageboard on 4chan
- Available in: English
- Owner: Hiroyuki Nishimura
- Founder: Christopher "moot" Poole
- Commercial: Yes
- Registration: Optional
- Launched: February 15, 2007; 19 years ago
- Current status: Online

/x/ is the paranormal board on 4chan, an English-language imageboard. Created in January 2005 as a general photography board, it was repurposed in February 2007 to focus on unexplained phenomena, the supernatural, and non-political conspiracy theories.

== History ==
The board was initially launched in January 2005 as 4chan's general photography board. In February 2007, it was repurposed as a paranormal-themed board, focusing on the supernatural and unexplained phenomena.

== Notable contributions ==
=== SCP Foundation ===
The SCP Foundation logo

The SCP Foundation, a collaborative writing wiki project documenting a fictional secret organization, originated on /x/ in 2007. The first SCP file, SCP-173, was posted by an anonymous user. Initially a stand-alone short story, many additional SCP files were created shortly after, copying SCP-173's style and establishing a shared fictional universe. The project later moved to its own wiki in January 2008.

=== Creepypasta, Ben Drowned, and The Backrooms ===
Many of the earliest creepypastas (Internet horror-related legends) were created on /x/. One of the most popular stories of the genre, Ben Drowned, was originally posted to the board in September 2010 with the author pretending to be a user who discovered a glitching video game. The Backrooms phenomenon originated from a thread on /x/ created on May 12, 2019, where users were asked to "post disquieting images that just feel 'off'." The first photo depicting the Backrooms was uploaded there, accompanied by a story claiming one enters the Backrooms when they "noclip out of reality in the wrong areas". The concept subsequently gained widespread popularity across social media.

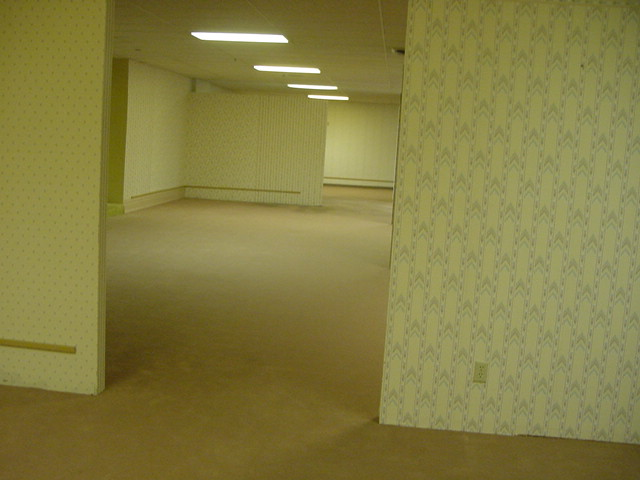
The original Backrooms image posted on /x/

=== Notable incidents ===
The board was the first place where the 2015 viral video 11B-X-1371 was posted. /x/ also played a significant role in investigating and popularizing the controversial Sad Satan video game.

=== Creepy Chan ===
American model Allison Harvard first gained internet fame in 2005 as an Internet meme on /x/ where she became known as "Creepy Chan" due to her distinctive appearance and interests. She later gained mainstream recognition through her appearances on America's Next Top Model in 2009 and 2011, during which she would visit /x/ to participate in discussions about herself.

== See also ==
- 4chan – Anonymous imageboard website
- Creepypasta – Horror-related media shared around the Internet
- SCP Foundation – Online collaborative writing project
- The Backrooms – Fictional location
- /b/ – Imageboard or online forum on 4chan
- /mlp/ – My Little Pony: Friendship Is Magic discussion board on 4chan
- /v/ – Videogames discussion board on 4chan
- r/nosleep – Subreddit dedicated to user-generated horror stories
