= SiteKey =

Web-based authentication service

- SiteKey is a web-based security system that provides one type of mutual authentication between end-users and websites. Its primary purpose is to deter phishing.

SiteKey was deployed by several large financial institutions in 2006, including Bank of America and The Vanguard Group. Both Bank of America and The Vanguard Group discontinued use in 2015.

The product is owned by RSA Data Security which in 2006 acquired its original maker, Passmark Security.

== How it works ==
SiteKey uses the following challenge–response technique:

1. The user identifies (not authenticates) themself to the site by entering their username (but not their password). If the username is a valid one, the site proceeds.
2. If the user's browser does not contain a client-side state token (such as a Web cookie or a Flash cookie) from a previous visit, the user is prompted for answers to one or more of the "security questions" the user-specified at site sign-up time, such as "Which school did you last attend?"
3. The site authenticates itself to the user by displaying an image and/or accompanying phrase that they have earlier configured. If the user does not recognize these as their own, they are to assume the site is a phishing site and immediately abandon it. If the user does recognize them, they may consider the site authentic and proceed.
4. The user authenticates themself to the site by entering their password. If the password is not valid for that username, the whole process begins again. If it is valid, the user is considered authenticated and logged in.

If the user is at a phishing site with a different Web site domain than the legitimate domain, the user's browser will refuse to send the state token in step (2); the phishing site owner will either need to skip displaying the correct security image, or prompt the user for the security question(s) obtained from the legitimate domain and pass on the answers. In theory, this could cause the user to become suspicious, since the user might be surprised to be re-prompted for security questions even if they have used the legitimate domain from their browser recently. However, in practice, there are evidence users generally fail to notice such anomalies.

== Weaknesses ==
A Harvard study found SiteKey 97% ineffective. In practice, real people don't notice, or don't care, when the SiteKey is missing, according to their results.

It also requires users to keep track of more authentication information. Someone associated with N different websites that use SiteKey must remember N different 4-tuples of information: (site, username, phrase, password).

== Discontinuation ==
In May 2015, Bank of America announced that SiteKey would be discontinued for all users by the end of the year, and would allow users to log in with their username and password in one step. In July 2015, Vanguard also discontinued the use of SiteKey for its website.
