= Burger King foot lettuce =

2012 internet meme and food scandal

The Burger King foot lettuce image posted to 4chan

In July 2012, a fast food scandal took place in the United States, in which an anonymous Burger King employee posted a photo of himself standing in plastic bins filled with lettuce onto the imageboard website 4chan. Users on 4chan soon determined via the photo's Exif data that the image was taken at a Burger King location in Mayfield Heights, Ohio. This resulted in marked damage to Burger King's brand image online as well as the firing of three employees. The incident has repeatedly gone viral.

== Incident ==
On July 16, 2012, an anonymous user on 4chan posted a photo taken three days earlier showing a Burger King employee standing on two restaurant insert pans of lettuce with the caption "This is the lettuce you eat at Burger King." Within fifteen minutes, other 4chan users were able to determine the photo was taken at a Burger King restaurant in Mayfield Heights, Ohio, through Exif metadata which accompanied the image as well as a barcode on a box. They began calling the restaurant and sending the photo to local news outlets, and the Mayfield Heights Facebook page was inundated with the photo and comments referencing it.

Three employees at the restaurant were fired, and the incident prompted an investigation by the Cuyahoga County Board of Health. The lettuce was thrown away the day after the photo was taken and before it was served to customers, as a manager had noticed that the lettuce was dirty. A textbook on crisis communication published by Cambridge University Press cited poor management supervision and inadequate social media training at Burger King as possible contributing factors to the incident.

== Reactions ==
Burger King issued a statement shortly after, saying that the restaurant was independently owned by a franchisee and highlighting their "stringent food handling procedures". A textbook on social media strategy published by vdf Hochschulverlag praised Burger King's response for its speed and decisiveness. Still, the image caused significant damage to the brand image of Burger King.

The meme's popularity was renewed in 2017, when YouTuber Chills (also known as Top15s) included the photo and its story as the opening segment of a video covering mysteries solved by 4chan users, introducing it as "number fifteen: Burger King foot lettuce". Several remixes of Chills's voiceover were created and shared, including an annotated version uploaded to lyrics site Genius.

In 2024, The Takeout writer Richard DiCicco described the meme as "one of the internet's longest-running jokes".
