= Ylilauta =

Finnish imageboard

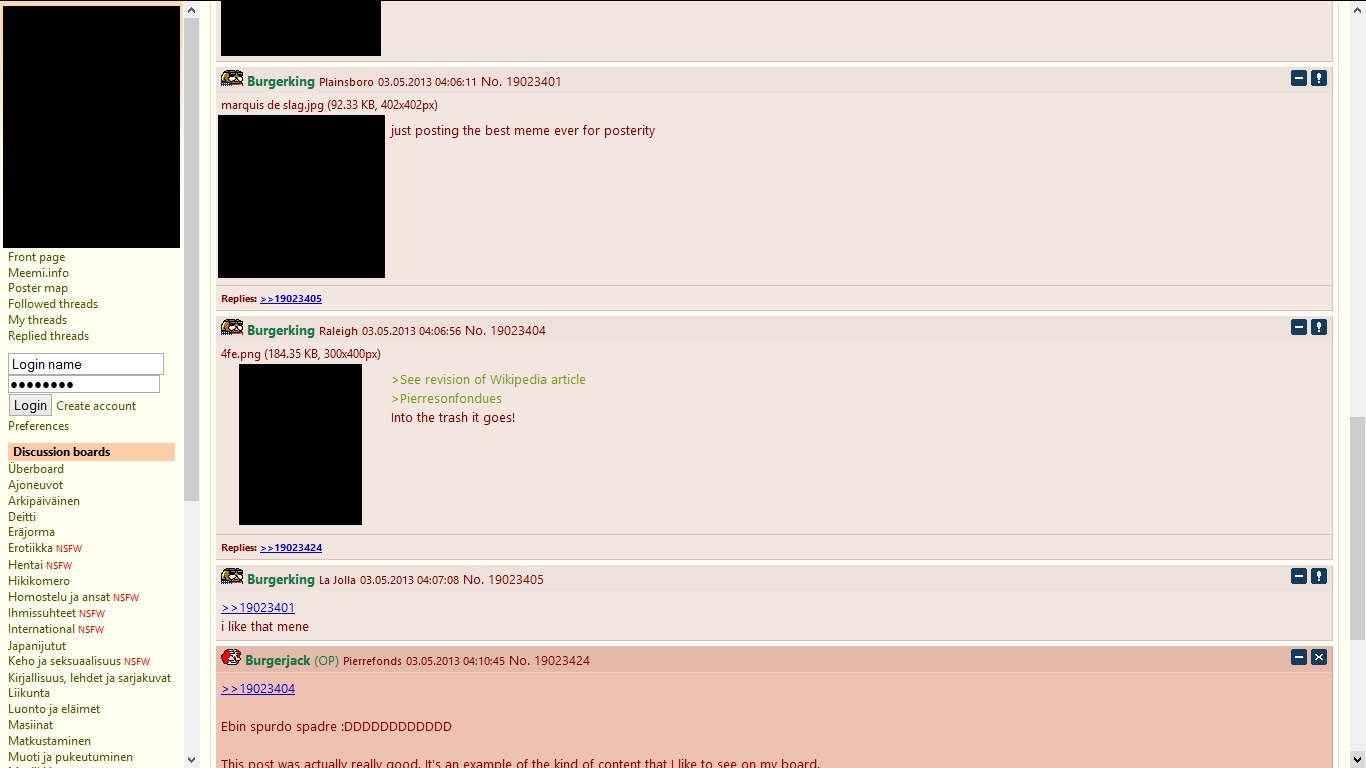
- A screenshot from Ylilauta
- Website type: Imageboard
- Available in: 4 active full editions (6 in total)
- Owner: Lauta Media Ltd
- Founder: Aleksi Kinnunen
- Website: ylilauta.org
- Commercial: Yes
- Registration: Optional
- Launched: February 20, 2011; 15 years ago

Ylilauta (Finnish pronunciation: [ˈyliˌlɑu̯tɑ]) is a Finnish imageboard. It was founded on February 20, 2011, to unite the two former most popular Finnish imageboards, Kotilauta and Lauta.net. Ylilauta is one of the most popular websites in Finland, and on the Finnish-speaking Internet. In 2011 "Ylilauta" was the fourth most searched word on Google in Finland.

Ylilauta has tens of thousands of users every day, and in June 2022 it was Similarweb's 35th most popular site in Finland according to listing. In December 2020, Ylilauta had more than 140 million sent messages.

== History ==
In 2011, users of Ylilauta published thousands of Finnish user account details for multiple Finnish websites, which led to Finland's largest series of data leaks.

Users of Ylilauta twice gathered a consolatory prize for two Finnish YouTubers who had not received an award at the annual Tubecon event, despite winning in the People's Choice category. The first was YouTuber Marko "markoboy87" Vidlund, who received a television and a PlayStation console, whereas Mikael "niilo22" Kosola, who was the second winner, received a bicycle, a Moccamaster coffee percolator, a PlayStation and an LED television set.

In October 2023, Ylilauta was converted into a partially paid service due to demands from the owners. Browsing the website is free, but older threads are only visible to users with a paid "gold account", which had already been available before the change. The time for a thread to be considered "old" varies between Ylilauta's subsections. News of the change were met with widespread derision from the userbase.

=== Role in the Vastaamo data breach ===
In October 2020 an anonymous hacker used Ylilauta to share data which he had acquired illegally in a data breach from the Vastaamo psychotherapist centre. The hacker(s) had previously threatened Vastaamo that they would release the data they had acquired, which Vastaamo had reported to the police. Ylilauta administration soon removed the data from the site. Technical director of F-Secure Mikko Hyppönen later approached the Ylilauta user base, requesting that any person who had downloaded a specific file that contained all the data acquired in the breach send a copy of it to the police, as it might contain technical information that might help the criminal investigation.

== See also ==
- 2channel, in Japanese
- 4chan, in English
- 8chan, in English
- Dvach, in Russian
- Futaba Channel, in Japanese
- Ilbe Storehouse, in Korean
