= Security question =

Question used to control access

A security question is a form of shared secret used as an authenticator. It is commonly used by banks, cable companies and wireless providers as an extra security layer.

== History ==
Financial institutions have used questions to authenticate customers since at least the early 20th century. In a 1906 speech at a meeting of a section of the American Bankers Association, Baltimore banker William M. Hayden described his institution's use of security questions as a supplement to customer signature records. He described the signature cards used in opening new accounts, which had spaces for the customer's birthplace, "residence," mother's maiden name, occupation and age.

Hayden noted that some of these items were often left blank and that the "residence" information was used primarily to contact the customer, but the mother's maiden name was useful as a "strong test of identity." Although he observed that it was rare for someone outside the customer's family to try to withdraw money from a customer account, he said that the mother's maiden name was useful in verification because it was rarely known outside the family and that even the people opening accounts were "often unprepared for this question." Similarly, under modern practice, a credit card provider could request a customer's mother's maiden name before issuing a replacement for a lost card.

In the 2000s, security questions came into widespread use on the Internet. As a form of self-service password reset, security questions have reduced information technology help desk costs. By allowing the use of security questions online, they are rendered vulnerable to keystroke logging and brute-force guessing attacks, as well as phishing. In addition, whereas a human customer service representative may be able to cope with inexact security answers appropriately, computers are less adept. As such, users must remember the exact spelling and sometimes even case of the answers they provide, which poses the threat that more answers will be written down, exposing them to physical theft.

== Application ==
Due to the commonplace nature of social-media, many of the older traditional security questions are no longer useful or secure. A security question is just another form of a password mechanism. Therefore, a security question should not be shared with anyone else, or include any information readily available on social media websites, while remaining simple, memorable, difficult to guess, and constant over time. Understanding that not every question will work for everyone, RSA (a U.S. network security provider, a division of EMC Corporation) gives banks 150 questions to choose from.

Many have questioned the usefulness of security questions. Security specialist Bruce Schneier points out that since they are public facts about a person, they are easier to guess for hackers than passwords. Users that know this create fake answers to the questions, then forget the answers, thus defeating the purpose and creating an inconvenience not worth the investment.

== See also ==
- Cognitive password
- Knowledge-based authentication
- Password fatigue
