= Dvach =

Russian imageboard website

Два.ч Dva.ch

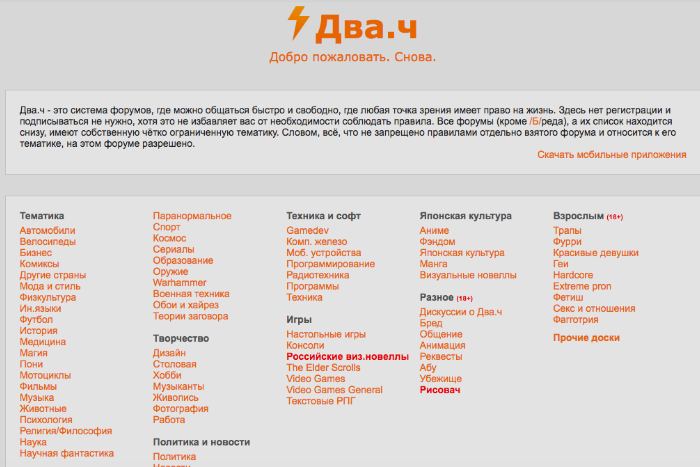
- 2ch.su main page and list of boards in 2017
- Website type: Imageboard
- Available in: Russian
- Owner: Nariman Namazov
- Website: 2ch.su, 2ch.life (mirror), t.me/dvachannel (official Telegram channel)
- Commercial: No
- Registration: optional, with paid passcodes
- Launched: May 9, 2009; 17 years ago

Dvach (Russian: Двач, from dva "two" and "chan"), also known as 2ch, is the largest Russian anonymous imageboard. It is a successor to an older Russian imageboard with the same name that was launched in 2006 but shut down three years later in 2009. As of 2026 the imageboard can be accessed via the 2ch.su domain name. It is owned and run by Russian-born Azerbaijani Nariman Namazov, nicknamed Abu.

The imageboard suffered significantly during a massive 2016 DDoS attack, after which it switched its hosting provider to the Russian state-affiliated Mail.Ru Group, leading many users to believe that it was sold to the company.

Dvach is often accused of cyberbullying, misogyny, and toxic trolling. It has also doxxed criminals.

== History ==
=== Original Dvach ===
The "old Dvach", 2ch.ru, was launched in February 2006 by Vikentiy Fesunov and was allegedly administered by Konstantin Grusha, who also co-owned several other Russian websites like Bash.im and anime.ru. Its userbase was mostly anime fans, influenced by 4chan, 2channel (from which the Dvach name was derived), and Russian communities popular at the time, especially LiveJournal bloggers.

2ch.ru was the first Russian-language imageboard. Later in 2007, some other websites were created. This includes iichan, a heavily moderated imageboard that was a "polite and non-toxic" alternative to Dvach; and now-defunct 0chan, an imageboard for tech geeks, which later developed into a refuge for Dvach users.

On 17 January 2009, 2ch.ru was closed. The domain name was still owned by Fesunov so that nobody would claim it. In 2023, Fesunov forgot to pay for the domain and it was claimed by unknown people which put placeholder on it. Some of the users went to 0chan, but numerous copies of Dvach were also launched, most notable being 2-ch.ru, known as Tirech (from тире, transl. "dash"), run by Vitalik and his moderation team.

Many users avoid using the name Dvach for 2ch.hk, because they believe the name is only appropriate for the original imageboard. They use various derogatory names instead, such as Kharkach (from харкать (harkat'), "to cough sputum out", referencing the .hk domain), Sosach (from сосать (sosat'), "to suck", from the previous domain name 2ch.so), Mailach (from alleged connections with the Mail.Ru Group), and Abuchan (from Abu) to refer to the newer site.

=== Change of administration ===
In November 2010, Vitalik resigned as an administrator, and a user named Abu succeeded him. He later revealed in an interview with his former classmate, Russian YouTube blogger Ilya Varlamov, that he had bought 2-ch for 10,000 dollars. Abu tolerated some of the derogatory and mocking names given to him and the board by the users, like Macaque or Sosach. He used images of Abu from Disney's Aladdin.

Abu changed the moderation team and banned some of the former moderators for their abuse of tripcodes and avatars. He also repressed many in-site user communities, such as Rozen Maiden and My Little Pony fans, and anime fans posting outside of the /a/ board.

Unlike previous owners and copy-cats, who tried to preserve the original image of Dvach, Abu introduced many innovations. The welcoming message was changed to Добро пожаловать. Снова. (transl. Welcome. Again.), becoming an informal slogan of 2ch.hk. The site used Makaba, a custom version of the widespread Wakaba engine. Abu was criticized by users for promoting the imageboard in social networks like Twitter and VK. When the board was advertised in MDK, one of the largest VK communities, the 2ch thread discussing this fact was deleted by Abu, who became a moderator in the community.

Abu also introduced subscriptions to the site, "passcodes", which allow users who have bought them to avoid captchas and attach up to eight images to their posts instead of the default four.

In 2011, Abu was doxxed. His identity was revealed as Nariman Namazov (Russian: Нариман Намазов), a 27-year-old Azerbaijani SEO specialist from Moscow. Initially, Abu tried to ridicule and dismiss the revelation, but it was confirmed in 2013. Since then, he officially represented 2ch.hk in media, and address users with annual New Year speeches.

=== Alleged Mail.Ru deal ===
In September 2016, during alleged DDoS attacks on 2ch.hk, the Mail.Ru Group, a state-affiliated company that owned a popular e-mail service and VK, provided its services to defend the website. It is widely believed that 2ch.hk was sold to the company, which was criticized by users. The speculated deal raised concerns about the disclosure of user data and anonymity principle violations. Many users left the website, and a large part of them migrated to Brchan, a Brazilian imageboard, later abandoned by its original users and completely taken over by Russians.

== Subculture and slang ==
Many Dvach terms have become widespread in Russian Internet slang, such as тян (tyan, "girl") and кун (kun, "guy"), both of which are derived from Japanese honorifics, всратый (vsratyi, "ugly", literally "shitted up"), and expressions like задавайте свои ответы (transl. "ask your answers" instead of "ask your questions").

Many newcomers tend to overuse some outdated local slang, which they imagine is appropriate.

Many terms have been borrowed from the West. Some of them have undergone Russification, like semyon (influenced by a Russian proper name, from English "same person", a poster who pretends to be several different people in a discussion) or sazha (literally "soot", from sage, a Japanese term for replying into a thread without bumping it). Sometimes 2ch serves as an introduction for Western memes to enter the Russian Internet.

The default software used by Dvach is Makaba, a fork of the Wakaba engine.

Officially, underage people are not allowed on the site. There are 18+ boards, which are explicitly related to sex. If a user is found to be underage, they are banned from all boards. Porn, both real-life and drawn, is generally tolerated and posted freely on all boards, except child pornography or zoophilia, which is forbidden by Russian law.

== Political stance ==
There is generally no common political stance among website users. Some of them do not like politics at all, and fiery political discussions outside of /po/ and similar boards.

Many widespread political memes originated on 2ch.hk. Users who do not like Vladimir Putin call him Pynya, while his supporters may call his opponent, Alexei Navalny, Sisyan (literally "tittied", referencing a photo of Navalny being overweight with manboobs).

In October 2018, Dvach users disclosed true identity of one of suspects who was allegedly involved in the poisoning of Sergei and Yulia Skripal and other British subjects in Salisbury. They emailed several Bellingcat investigators to whom they provided public photos of him showing his real name on a board of honorably awarded military serviceman and his participation in public events in the Russian Far Eastern High General Military Command Academy.

== Controversies ==
=== Pranks ===
After incidents like terrorist attacks or mass shootings, Dvach users prank people on social networks with fake eulogies, featuring the site owner Nariman Namazov or former porn star Sasha Grey as victims or perpetrators, akin to how Sam Hyde is accused of being the perpetrator of various shootings by users on 4chan.

In 2015, Sasha Grey reacted to and denied the rumor that she was murdered during the war in Donbas.

In January 2019, Novaya Gazeta reported that according to its sources, the perpetrator of the 2018 Magnitogorsk gas explosion was "Norimonov Namazjon Wakabliyevich", later refuting this information.

=== Offline events ===
In September 2017, a Dvach user placed a large poster with the Sisyan meme on a railway bridge during a Navalny demonstration in Novosibirsk.

In November 2018, three activists installed a Putin doll with the inscription "War criminal Pynya V.V." in Perm. All of them were arrested.

=== Blocking attempts ===
In August 2015, the /g/ ("naked girls") board was blocked in Russia after alleged posts of child pornography.

In May 2017, Dvach was blocked in Ukraine, along with other services hosted by the Mail.Ru Group.

In November 2019, Russian Internet regulators demanded that Dvach delete posts degrading state symbols, and threatened the site with blocking.

Dvach's official Twitter account was blocked on 14 March 2020. Representatives said it was due to copyright infringement on the new account, but users speculated that it was related to a conflict with Russian feminist activists.

In March 2020, Dvach was temporarily blocked due to COVID-19 misinformation.

=== Hacking cases ===
Back in 2011, Dvach users were accused of DDoS attacks against opposition websites.

After the Kerch Polytechnic College massacre, the perpetrator's (Vladislav Roslyakov) accounts were hacked and his direct messages were posted on Dvach making him even more popular among users.

In July 2019, hackers stole 7.5 TB of data from the SyTech company, an FSB contractor. They also defaced the company's website with the Yoba meme.

In October 2019, a Dvach user hacked the NATO Rapid Deployable Corps – Italy website. He replaced the info about the corps commander with a derisive biography of Namazov. He placed a link to 2ch.hk accompanied by the Yoba meme.

=== Doxxing pornstars ===
Dvach is often criticized for their attitude towards women. In April 2016, Dvach users doxxed Russian porn actresses, outing them to their friends and families. They used FindFace, a face recognition service that searched in the photos uploaded on VK.

In early 2020, Dvach users doxxed Russian women who participated in a porn-horror video by Till Lindemann, a Rammstein vocalist. The users criticized them for "degrading the image of Russian women". Russian feminist activist Zalina Marshenkulova, who stood up for the women, accused Dvach users of death threats and cyberbullying against her.

=== Attacking celebrities ===
Users from the site often attack Russian celebrities. In October 2019, Russian comedian Garik Kharlamov was deemed a "cuckold" after his wife Kristina Asmus filmed an erotic scene in Text. The couple later divorced, but said it was not related to the Dvach trolling.

In March 2020, TV host Andrey Malakhov was called "the chief scavenger" in the official 2ch Twitter for hyping on tragedies and deadly incidents.

=== Finding criminals ===
In October 2016, Dvach doxxed two teenage girls from Khabarovsk who bragged about torturing animals and offending homeless people in their social networks. They got prison sentences.

In October 2018, Dvach users helped Bellingcat get insights into suspected perpetrators of the Poisoning of Sergei and Yulia Skripal.

In February 2019, users doxxed a child porn studio in Kyiv, Ukraine, and officials arrested its organizers.

In February 2020, a 2ch user posted photos from a hospital, claiming to be a male nurse, and said that he "loves disabling the ventilators and watching the agony of dying old (World War II) veterans", saying that he had already killed more than ten people. Sergey Kalinin, 26, from Perm apologized and said that it was a prank and he actually did not kill anyone; he was fired from the hospital.

== See also ==
- 2channel (in Japan)
- Futaba Channel
- 4chan (International)
- 8chan (International)
- Ylilauta (in Finland)
- Ilbe Storehouse
