= Out of wallet =

Concept in authentication of user identity

Out of wallet (sometimes abbreviated as OOW) refers to private data used for authentication in activities such as telephone banking or internet banking to prevent identity theft. The practice may part of a knowledge-based authentication process.

Ideally, out-of-wallet information is easily recallable by a user but obscure to most other persons and difficult for them to uncover. Prompts for out-of-wallet questions are now often generated automatically through convergence of databases containing users' financial transactions, vehicle registrations, and other records.

Typical out-of-wallet questions a user may be asked include:

1. What was the color of your first car?
2. What is the name of the first school you attended?
3. What is the name of the hospital you were born in?

Such information is available to a database compiler but may not be readily available to criminals attempting to commit identity theft.
