= Duolicious =

Free and open source mobile phone app

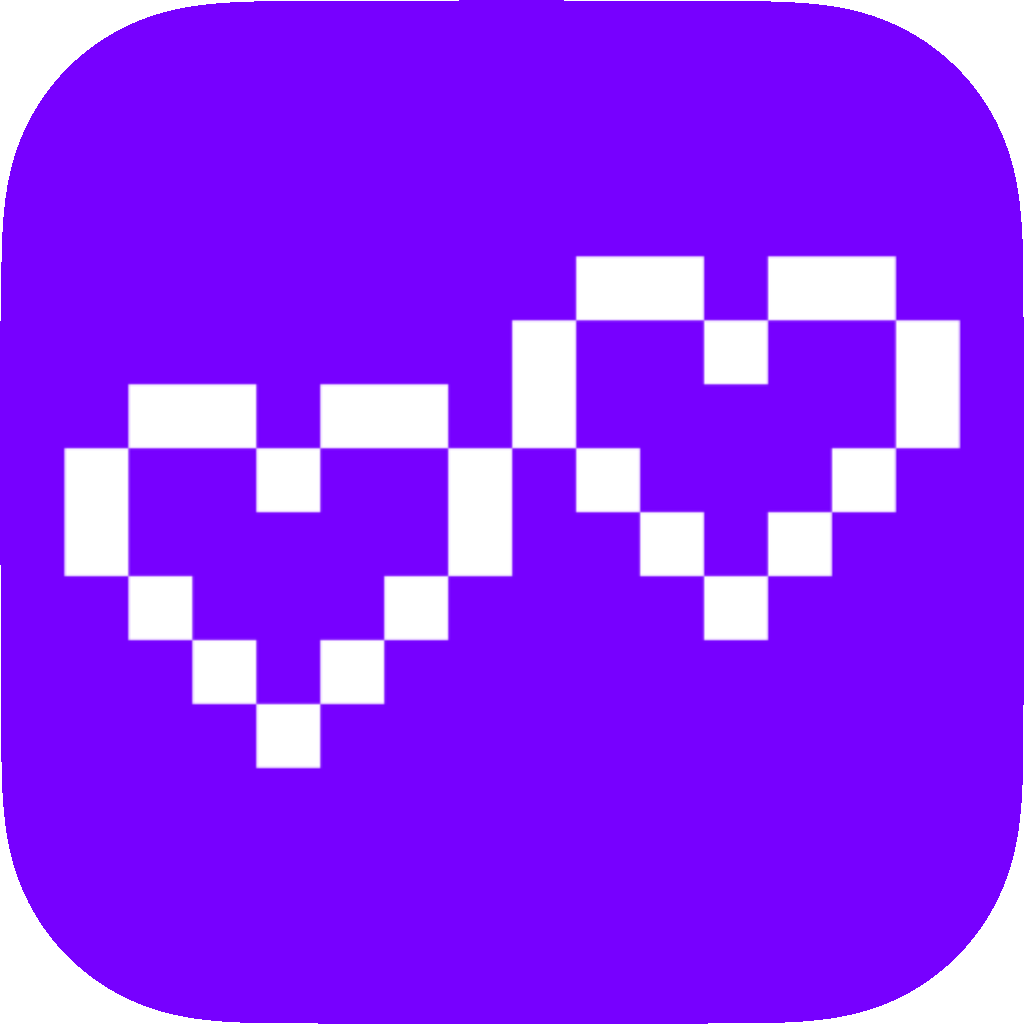

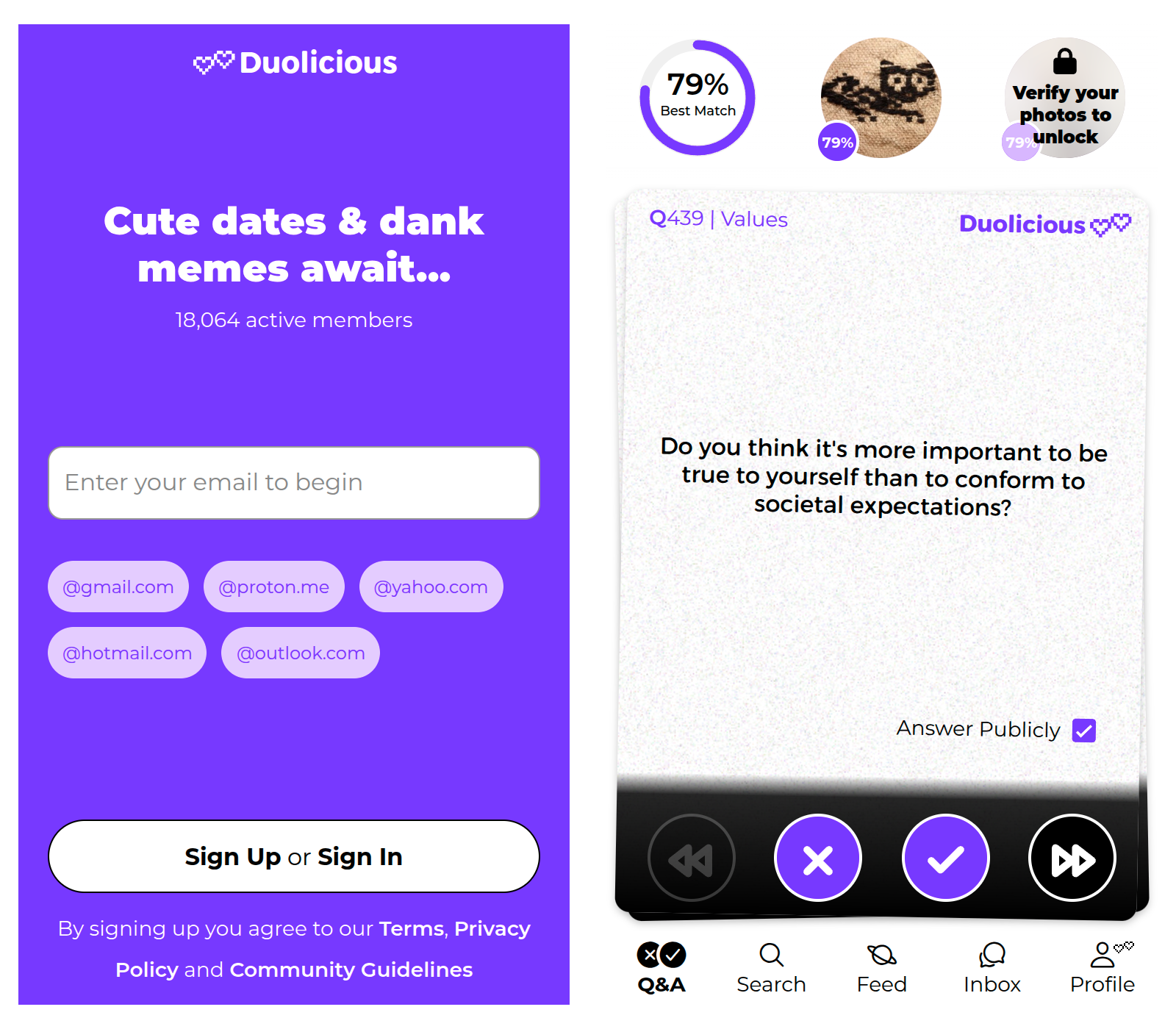
- Duolicious 31.1.0 running on iOS
- Release: July 21, 2023; 3 years ago
- Written in: Python, TypeScript (React Native)
- Operating system: iOS; Android; Web
- Type: Social networking
- License: AGPLv3
- Website: duolicious.app
- Repository: github.com/duolicious

Duolicious is a free and open-source dating app which received media attention due to its association with the anonymous imageboard 4chan. The app has variously been called the "4chan dating app" and the "femcel dating app".

== History ==
On July 21, 2023, an anonymous user posted a link to a self-made free and open source dating app on 4chan's /soc/ board, initially describing it as an "experimental matchmaking algorithm".

In May 2024, the app went viral, briefly outranking mainstream apps including eHarmony on Google Play's "Top for $0" dating category despite the app's creator stating "it was only meant to be a meme app". Mashable described it as "an amalgamation of other, better dating apps like Grindr and OkCupid."

During this time, Duolicious was subject to an alleged data breach. However this was later revealed to be a scrape of profile information that could have been accessed by anyone possessing a Duolicious account. The scraped data was published on a website which allowed it to be searched without a Duolicious account.

== Development and licensing ==
The server is implemented in Python and the client in TypeScript using React Native.

The source code is released under the GNU Affero General Public License version 3.
