= Knowledge-based authentication =

Method of user authentication that requires knowledge of private information

Knowledge-based authentication, commonly referred to as KBA, is a method of authentication which seeks to prove the identity of someone accessing a service such as a financial institution or website. As the name suggests, KBA requires the knowledge of private information from the individual to prove that the person providing the identity information is the owner of the identity. There are two types of KBA: static KBA, which is based on a pre-agreed set of shared secrets, and dynamic KBA, which is based on questions generated from a wider base of personal information.

== Static KBA (shared secrets) ==
Static KBA, also referred to as "shared secrets" or "shared secret questions," is commonly used by banks, financial services companies and e-mail providers to prove the identity of the customer before allowing account access or, as a fall-back, if the user forgets their password. At the point of initial contact with a customer, a business using static KBA must collect the information to be shared between the provider and customer—most commonly the questions and corresponding answers. This data must then be stored only to be retrieved when the customer comes back to access the account.

The weakness of static KBA was demonstrated in an incident in 2008 where unauthorized access was gained to the e-mail account of former Alaska Governor Sarah Palin. The Yahoo! account's password could be reset using shared secret questions including "where did you meet your spouse?" along with the date of birth and ZIP code of the former governor to which answers were easily available online.

Some identity verification providers have recently introduced secret sounds or pictures in an effort to help secure sites and information. These tactics require the same methods of data storage and retrieval as secret questions.

== Dynamic KBA ==
Dynamic KBA is a high level of authentication that uses knowledge questions to verify each individual identity but does not require the person to have provided the questions and answers beforehand. Questions are compiled from public and private data such as marketing data, credit reports or transaction history.

To initiate the process, basic identification factors such as name, address and date of birth must be provided by the consumer and checked with an identity verification service. After the identity is verified, questions are generated in real time from the data records corresponding to the individual identity provided. Typically, the knowledge needed to answer the questions is not available in a person's wallet (some companies call them "out-of-wallet questions") making it difficult for anyone other than the actual identity owner to know the answer and obtain access to secured information. Generally, the length of time and number of attempts provided to respond are limited to prevent the answers being researched.

Dynamic KBA is employed in several different industries to verify the identities of customers as a means of fraud prevention and compliance adherence. Because this type of KBA is not based on an existing relationship with a consumer, it gives businesses a way to have higher identity assurance on customer identity during account origination.

== See also ==
- Cognitive password
- Identity verification service
- Multi-factor authentication
- Out of wallet
