= Mike Kernell =

American politician (born 1951)

Member of the Tennessee House of Representatives from the 93rd district
- In office January 7, 1975 – January 8, 2013
- Preceded by: Brad Martin (redistricted)
- Succeeded by: G. A. Hardaway

Personal details
- Born: Michael L. Kernell; December 20, 1951 (age 74) Memphis, Tennessee, U.S.
- Party: Democratic
- Spouse: Lillian Landrigan
- Children: 2

Michael L. Kernell (born December 20, 1951) is an American politician who served as a Democratic member of the Tennessee House of Representatives from 1975 to 2013.

Kernell was first elected to the Tennessee General Assembly in 1974. He represented the 93rd district, encompassing portions of Shelby County. He was vice chair of the Government Operations Committee and a member of the Conservation and Environment Committee, the Parks and Tourism and Wildlife Subcommittee.

Kernell opposed 2004 cutbacks to TennCare, which he criticized for moving the burden of paying for medical care received by the uninsured to local taxpayers.

== Political career ==
Kernell was first elected to the State House in 1974. In the November 2008 elections, he defeated Republican candidate and former Homeland Security agent Tim Cook.

Cook was again the Republican nominee in 2010, and Kernell again defeated him, with 6,478 votes to Cook's 4,518.

Kernell's district was redrawn in 2012 by the Republican-controlled legislature, pitting him against fellow Democratic incumbent G. A. Hardaway in the August 2, 2012, Democratic primary. Kernell lost to Hardaway, ending his 38-year tenure. Hardaway won the primary with 2,927 votes (61.0%), and was unopposed in the November 6, 2012, general election, winning with 16,126 votes.

== Personal life ==
Kernell is married and has two children.

In October 2008, Kernell's son David was indicted by a Tennessee grand jury in connection with the unauthorized access of Republican vice presidential candidate Sarah Palin's email account; he was convicted on April 30, 2010, on two counts of anticipatory obstruction of justice and unauthorized access to a computer, but he was acquitted on a charge of wire fraud. Mike Kernell denied knowing anything about the incident. David died in 2018 after complications from progressive multiple sclerosis.
