= 4chan =

Anonymous imageboard website

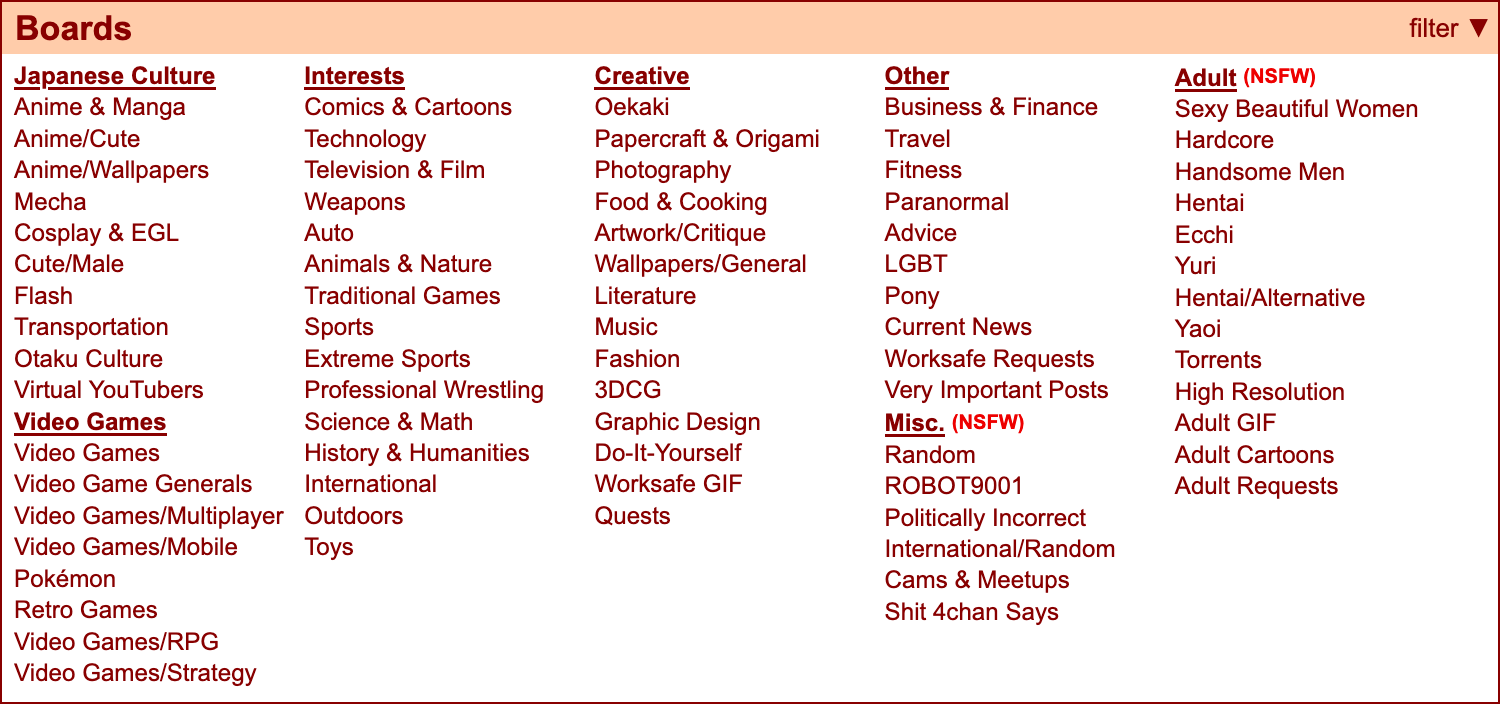
- Homepage on May 3, 2023
- Website type: Imageboard
- Available in: English
- Country of origin: United States
- Owner: Hiroyuki Nishimura (2015–present)
- Creator: Christopher Poole
- Services: 4chan Pass
- Website: www.4chan.org
- Advertising: Yes
- Commercial: Yes
- Registration: None (except for staff)
- Launched: October 1, 2003 (23 years ago)
- Current status: Active
- Written in: PHP

4chan is an anonymous English-language imageboard website. Launched by Christopher "moot" Poole in October 2003, the site hosts boards dedicated to a wide variety of topics, including video games, television, literature, cooking, weapons, music, history, technology, anime, physical fitness, politics, and sports, among others. Registration is not available, except for staff, and users typically post anonymously. As of 2022, 4chan was receiving more than 22 million unique monthly visitors, of whom approximately half are from the United States.

4chan was created as an unofficial English-language counterpart to the Japanese imageboard Futaba Channel, also known as 2chan, and its first boards were originally used for posting images and discussion related to anime. The site has been described as a hub of Western Internet subculture, its community being influential in the formation and popularization of prominent Internet memes, such as lolcats, Rickrolling, rage comics, wojaks, Pepe the Frog, as well as hacktivist and political movements, such as Anonymous and the alt-right.

4chan has often been the subject of media attention as a source of controversies, including the coordination of pranks and harassment against websites and Internet users, and the posting of illegal and offensive content as a result of its lax censorship and moderation policies. In 2008, The Guardian summarized the 4chan community as "lunatic, juvenile [...] brilliant, ridiculous and alarming".

== Background ==
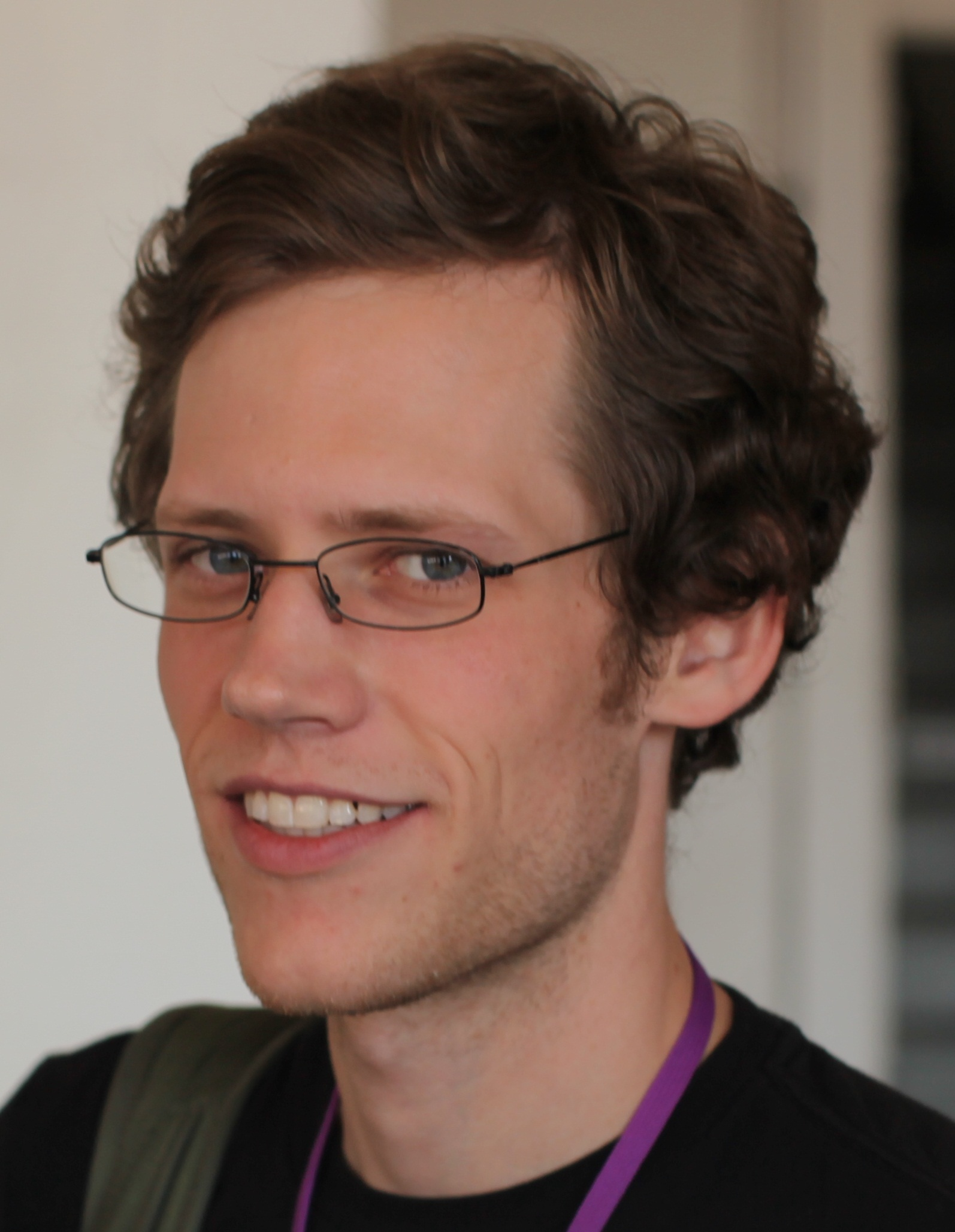
Christopher Poole, 4chan's founder, at XOXO Festival in 2012

The majority of posting on 4chan takes place on imageboards, on which users have the ability to share images and create threaded discussions. As of August 2022, the site's homepage lists 75 imageboards and one Flash animation board. Most boards have their own set of rules and are dedicated to a specific topic, including anime and manga, video games, music, literature, fitness, politics, and sports, among others. Uniquely, the "Random" board—also known as /b/—has few rules.

In 2008, 4chan was one of the Internet's busiest imageboards, according to the Los Angeles Times. 4chan's Alexa rank was 853 in March 2022, though it has been as high as 56. It is provided to its users free of charge and consumes a large amount of bandwidth; as a result, its financing has often been problematic. Poole has acknowledged that donations alone could not keep the site online, and turned to advertising to help make ends meet. However, the explicit content hosted on 4chan has deterred businesses who do not want to be associated with the site's content. In January 2009, Poole signed a new deal with an advertising company; in February 2009, he was $20,000 in debt, and the site continued to lose money. The 4chan servers were moved from Texas to California in August 2008, which upgraded the maximum bandwidth throughput of 4chan from 100 Mbit/s to 1 Gbit/s.

Unlike most web forums, 4chan does not have a registration system, allowing users to post anonymously. Posting is ephemeral, as threads receiving recent replies are "bumped" to the top of their respective board and old threads are deleted as new ones are created. Any nickname may be used when posting, even one that has been previously adopted, such as "Anonymous" or "moot". In place of registration, 4chan has provided tripcodes as an optional form of authenticating a poster's identity. As making a post without filling in the "Name" field causes posts to be attributed to "Anonymous", general understanding on 4chan holds that Anonymous is not a single person but a collective (hive) of users.

Moderators generally post without a name even when performing sysop actions. A "capcode" may be used to attribute the post to "Anonymous ## Mod", although moderators often post without the capcode. In a 2011 interview on Nico Nico Douga, Poole explained that there are approximately 20 volunteer moderators active on 4chan. (Note: As explained by Poole during a live-video online interview with Hiroyuki Nishimura, founder of 2channel, on the Japanese website Nico Nico Douga during his trip to Japan in 2011) 4chan also has a junior moderation team, called "janitors", who may delete posts or images and suggest that the normal moderation team ban a user, but who cannot post with a capcode. Revealing oneself as a janitor is grounds for immediate dismissal. Gianluca Stringhini, an associate professor at Boston University College of Engineering, said in August 2024, "The only moderation on the platform appears to be for clearly illegal content, such as child pornography. Everything else remains untouched."

4chan has been the target of occasional denial of service attacks. For instance, on December 28, 2010, 4chan and other websites went down due to such an attack, following which Poole said on his blog, "We now join the ranks of MasterCard, Visa, PayPal, et al. - an exclusive club!"

== History ==
=== 2000s ===
The site was launched as 4chan.net on October 1, 2003, by Christopher Poole, a then-15-year-old student from New York City using the online handle "moot". Poole had been a regular participant on Something Awful's subforum "Anime Death Tentacle Rape Whorehouse" (ADTRW), where many users were familiar with the Japanese imageboard format and Futaba Channel ("2chan.net"). When creating 4chan, Poole obtained Futaba Channel's open source code and translated the Japanese text into English using AltaVista's Babel Fish online translator. After the site's creation, Poole invited users from the ADTRW subforum, many of whom were dissatisfied with the site's moderation, to visit 4chan, which he advertised as an English-language counterpart to Futaba Channel and a place for Western fans to discuss anime and manga. At its founding, the site only hosted one board: /b/ (Anime/Random).

Before the end of 2003, several new anime-related boards were added, including /h/ (Hentai), /c/ (Anime/Cute), /d/ (Hentai/Alternative), /w/ (Wallpapers/Anime), /y/ (Yaoi), and /a/ (Anime). In the early days of the website, Poole hosted meetings from 2005 to 2008 in various locations to promote it, such as Otakon, that popularized some of the first 4chan-related memes.

Additionally, a lolicon board was created at /l/ (Lolikon), but was disabled following the posting of real-life child pornography and ultimately deleted in October 2004, after threats of legal action. In February 2004, GoDaddy suspended the 4chan.net domain, prompting Poole to move the site to its current domain at 4chan.org. On March 1, 2004, Poole announced that he lacked the funds to pay the month's server bill, but was able to continue operations after receiving a swarm of donations from users. In June 2004, 4chan experienced six weeks of downtime due to PayPal suspending 4chan's donations service after receiving complaints about the site's content.

Following 4chan's return, several non-anime related boards were introduced, including /k/ (Weapons), /o/ (Auto), and /v/ (Video Games). In 2008, nine new boards were created, including the sports board at /sp/, the fashion board at /fa/ and the "Japan/General" (the name later changed to "Otaku Culture") board at /jp/. By this point, 4chan's culture had altered, moving away from the "early, more childish," humour, as evident by the likes of Project Chanology; trolling underwent a so-called "golden age" that took aim at American corporate media.

=== 2010s ===
In January 2011, Poole announced the deletion of the /r9k/ ("ROBOT9000") and /new/ (News) boards, saying that /new/ had become devoted to racist discussions, and /r9k/ no longer served its original purpose of being a test implementation of xkcd's ROBOT9000 script. During the same year, the /soc/ board was created in an effort to reduce the number of socialization threads on /b/. /r9k/ was restored on October 23, 2011, along with /hc/ ("Hardcore", previously deleted), /pol/ (a rebranding of /new/) and the new /diy/ board, in addition to an apology by Poole where he recalls how he criticized the deletion of Encyclopedia Dramatica and realized that he had done the same.

In 2010, 4chan had implemented reCAPTCHA in an effort to thwart spam arising from JavaScript worms. By November 2011, 4chan made the transition to utilizing Cloudflare following a series of DDoS attacks. The 4chan imageboards were rewritten in valid HTML5/CSS3 in May 2012 in an effort to improve client-side performance. On September 28, 2012, 4chan introduced a "4chan pass" that, when purchased, "allows users to bypass typing a reCAPTCHA verification when posting and reporting posts on the 4chan image boards"; the money raised from the passes to go towards supporting the site.

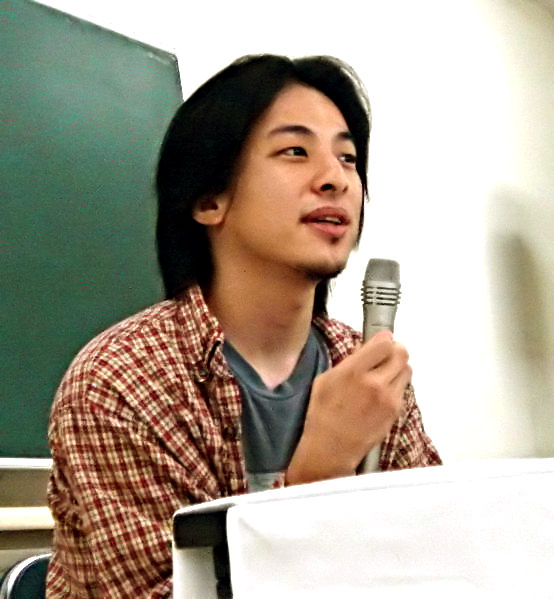
Hiroyuki Nishimura, the owner of 4chan since 2015

On January 21, 2015, Poole stepped down as the site's administrator, citing stress from controversies such as Gamergate as the reason for his departure. On September 21, 2015, Poole announced that Hiroyuki Nishimura had purchased from him the ownership rights to 4chan, without disclosing the terms of the acquisition. Nishimura was the former administrator of 2channel between 1999 and 2014, the website forming the basis for anonymous posting culture which influenced later websites such as Futaba Channel and 4chan; Nishimura lost 2channel's domain after it was seized by his registrar, Jim Watkins due to the latter's alleged financial difficulties. Wired later reported that Japanese toy manufacturer Good Smile Company, Japanese telecommunication Dwango, and Nishimura's company Future Search Brazil may have helped facilitate Nishimura's purchase, with anonymous sources telling the publication that Good Smile obtained partial ownership in the website as compensation.

In October 2016, it was reported that the site was facing financial difficulties that could lead to its closure or radical changes. In a post titled "Winter is Coming", Hiroyuki Nishimura explained, "We had tried to keep 4chan as is. But I failed. I am sincerely sorry", citing server costs, infrastructure costs, and network fees.

On November 17, 2018, it was announced that the site would be split into two, with the work-safe boards moved to a new domain, 4channel.org, while the NSFW boards would remain on the 4chan.org domain. In a series of posts on the topic, Nishimura explained that the split was due to 4chan being blacklisted by most advertising companies and that the new 4channel domain would allow for the site to receive advertisements by mainstream ad providers. All boards returned to the 4chan.org domain in December 2023 for unknown reasons, and 4channel.org now redirects to 4chan.org.

=== 2020s ===
In a 2020 interview with Vice Media, several current or past moderators spoke about what they perceived as racist intent behind the site's management. They alleged that a managing moderator, known online as RapeApe, was attempting to use the site as a recruitment tool for the alt-right, and that Nishimura was "hands-off, leaving moderation of the site primarily to RapeApe." Neither Nishimura nor RapeApe responded to these allegations. Far-right extremism has been reported by public authorities, commentators and civil society groups as connected, in part, to 4chan, an association that had arisen by 2015. According to 4chan's filings to the New York Attorney General's Office, 4chan signed an agreement to pay RapeApe $3,000 a month for their services in 2015. By May 2022, that fee had risen to $4,400 a month. The submitted documents also revealed RapeApe lamenting that 4chan was "getting the shaft" over the Buffalo terrorist attack and his attempt to persuade the advertising platform Bid.Glass to reverse their exit from the website.

On April 14, 2025, 4chan was hacked by an anonymous user who later announced the hack on soyjak.party, a rival imageboard website with origins related to 4chan. Source code and user logins of those who registered with emails were apparently acquired by the user and leaked online. Additionally, the deleted /qa/ board was restored. On soyjak.party, information purporting to be from the hack was released, claiming "admin" level access, a lack of updates to the site since 2016, and identities of admins, among other claims. One of the last known posts made on 4chan before it was taken down was the "Chicken jockey!" quote, taken from A Minecraft Movie. In the days following the attacks, 4chan and Nishimura's official Twitter accounts released statements confirming that they would work to fix security vulnerabilities and return at a later date. The site returned on April 25.

Due to its temporary unavailability, some users took to the site's Downdetector page, using its comment section as a temporary replacement for the website.

On May 21, 2026, the /r/ Adult Requests board was deleted following claims of deepfaked nude photos of celebrities being requested on the /r/ board.

On October 21, 2026, 4chan went offline in response to the PHP2Shell vulnerability.

=== Christopher Poole ===
Poole concealed his real-life identity until it was revealed on July 9, 2008, in The Wall Street Journal. Prior to that, he had used the alias "moot".

In April 2009, an open Internet poll conducted by Time magazine voted Poole as the world's most influential person of 2008. The results were questioned even before the poll completed, as automated voting programs and manual ballot stuffing were used to influence the vote. 4chan's interference with the vote seemed increasingly likely, when it was found that reading the first letter of the first 21 candidates in the poll spelled out a phrase containing two 4chan memes: "mARBLECAKE. ALSO, THE GAME."

On September 12, 2009, Poole gave a talk regarding 4chan's reputation as a "Meme Factory" at the Paraflows Symposium in Vienna, Austria, which was part of the Paraflows 09 festival, themed Urban Hacking: Cultural Jamming Strategies in the Risky Spaces of Modernity. In this talk, Poole mainly attributed this both to the anonymous system and to the lack of data retention on the site ("The site has no memory.").

In April 2010, Poole testified in the trial United States of America v. David Kernell as a government witness, explaining the terminology used on 4chan to the prosecutor, ranging from "OP" to "lurker", as well as the nature of the data given to the FBI as part of the search warrant, including how users can be uniquely identified from site audit logs.

== Notable boards ==
Board	Name	NSFW	Year created
/3/	3DCG	No	2005
/a/	Anime & Manga	No	2003
/aco/	Adult Cartoons	Yes	2015
/adv/	Advice	No	2010
/an/	Animals & Nature	No	2006
/asp/	Alternative Sports	No	2013
/b/	Random	Yes	2003
/bant/	International/Random	Yes	2017
/biz/	Business & Finance	No	2014
/c/	Anime/Cute	No	2003
/cgl/	Cosplay & EGL	No	2006
/ck/	Cooking	No	2006
/cm/	Cute/Male	No	2004
/co/	Comics & Cartoons	No	2006
/d/	Hentai/Alternative	Yes	2003
/diy/	Do It Yourself	No	2011
/e/	Ecchi	Yes	2005
/fa/	Fashion	No	2008
/fit/	Fitness	No	2008
/g/	Technology	No	2003
/gd/	Graphic Design	No	2013
/gif/	Adult GIF	Yes	2005
/h/	Hentai	Yes	2003
/hc/	Hardcore	Yes	2008
/his/	History & Humanities	No	2015
/hm/	Handsome Men	Yes	2012
/hr/	High Resolution	Yes	2005
/i/	Oekaki	No	2003
/ic/	Artwork/Critique	No	2005
/int/	International	No	2011
/jp/	Otaku Culture	No	2008
/k/	Weapons	No	2004
/lgbt/	LGBT	No	2013
/lit/	Literature	No	2010
/m/	Mecha	No	2004
/mlp/	Pony	No	2012
/mu/	Music	No	2006
/n/	Transportation	No	2006
/news/	Current News	No	2015
/o/	Auto	No	2004
/out/	Outdoors	No	2013
/p/	Photography	No	2005
/po/	Papercraft & Origami	No	2006
/pol/	Politically Incorrect	Yes	2011
/pw/	Professional Wrestling	No	2021
/qa/	Question & Answer	No	2015 (closed 2021)
/qst/	Quests	No	2016
/r9k/	ROBOT9001	Yes	2008
/s/	Sexy Beautiful Women	Yes	2003
/s4s/	Shit 4chan Says	Yes	2013
/sci/	Science & Math	No	2010
/sp/	Sports	No	2006
/soc/	Cams & Meetups	Yes	2011
/t/	Torrents	Yes	2003
/tg/	Traditional Games	No	2007
/toy/	Toys	No	2008
/trash/	Off-Topic	Yes	2015
/trv/	Travel	No	2008
/tv/	Television & Film	No	2006
/u/	Yuri	Yes	2004
/v/	Video Games	No	2004
/vg/	Video Game Generals	No	2012
/vip/	Very Important Posts	No	2016
/vm/	Video Games/Multiplayer	No	2020
/vmg/	Video Games/Mobile	No	2020
/vp/	Pokémon	No	2010
/vr/	Retro Games	No	2013
/vrpg/	Video Games/RPG	No	2020
/vst/	Video Games/Strategy	No	2020
/vt/	Virtual YouTubers	No	2021
/w/	Anime/Wallpapers	No	2003
/wg/	Wallpapers/General	No	2005
/wsg/	Worksafe GIF	No	2012
/wsr/	Worksafe Requests	No	2015
/x/	Paranormal	No	2007
/xs/	Extreme Sports	No	2021
/y/	Yaoi	Yes	2003

=== /b/ ===
The "random" board, /b/, follows the design of Futaba Channel's Nijiura ("Random") board. It was the first board created, and has been described as 4chan's most popular board, accounting for 30% of site traffic in 2009. Gawker's Nick Douglas summarized /b/ as a board where "people try to shock, entertain, and coax free porn from each other." /b/ has a "no rules" policy, except for bans on certain illegal content, such as child pornography, invasions of other websites (posting floods of disruptive content), and under-18 viewing, all of which are inherited from site-wide rules. The "no invasions" rule was added in late 2006, after /b/ users spent most of that summer "invading" Habbo Hotel. The "no rules" policy also applies to actions of administrators and moderators, which means that users may be banned at any time, for any reason, including for no reason at all. Due partially to its anonymous nature, board moderation is not always successful—indeed, the site's anti-child pornography rule is a subject of jokes on /b/. Christopher Poole told The New York Times, in a discussion on the moderation of /b/, that "the power lies in the community to dictate its own standards" and that site staff simply provided a framework.

The humor of /b/'s many users, who refer to themselves as "/b/tards", is often incomprehensible to newcomers and outsiders, and is characterized by intricate inside jokes and dark comedy. Users often refer to each other, and much of the outside world, as fags. They are often referred to by outsiders as trolls, who regularly act with the intention of "doing it for the lulz", a corruption of "LOL" used to denote amusement at another's expense. A significant amount of media coverage is in response to /b/'s culture, which has been characterized as adolescent, crude and spiteful, with one publication writing that their "bad behavior is encouraged by the site's total anonymity and the absence of an archive". Douglas cited Encyclopedia Dramatica's definition of /b/ as "the asshole of the Internets [sic]". Mattathias Schwartz of The New York Times likened /b/ to "a high-school bathroom stall, or an obscene telephone party line", while Baltimore City Paper wrote that "in the high school of the Internet, /b/ is the kid with a collection of butterfly knives and a locker full of porn." Wired describes /b/ as "notorious".

Each post is assigned a post number. Certain post numbers are sought after with a large amount of posting taking place to "GET" them. A "GET" occurs when a post's number ends in a special number, such as 12345678, 22222222, or every millionth post. A sign of 4chan's scaling, according to Poole, was when GETs lost meaning due to the high post rate resulting in a GET occurring every few weeks. He estimated /b/'s post rate in July 2008 to be 150,000–200,000 posts per day.

=== /lit/ ===
/lit/ was established in 2010 and is a board for discussing books and literature. The board generally focuses on classic works of the Western canon as well as modern literary fiction and postmodern literature.

=== /lgbt/ ===
/lgbt/ is a board dedicated to discussion of the LGBTQ+ community. Established in March 18, 2013, the board was added as the site's first one devoted to a social issue and it was met with surpise among the site's userbase, many of whom questioned if the board was a hoax or added for April Fools' Day. The board became filled with common threads involve discussion of reproductive rights, gender identity, same-sex marriage, and personal issues. It's anonymity allowed users posting sincere opinions, opposed to cruel forms of interaction often used in the broader site. /lgbt/ is frequently referred to by its users as /tttt/, a reference to the majority of its users being transgender. Its culture is influenced by those of both the broader site and the online transgender community, and is characterised by self-deprecating humour and the use of unique vernacular.

=== /mlp/ ===
The My Little Pony board, /mlp/, titled as Pony, is dedicated to discussion of the animated television series My Little Pony: Friendship Is Magic and its associated fandom. Created on February 16, 2012, the board was established by Poole in response to the growing popularity of pony-related content flooding other boards, particularly /co/ and /b/. Along with the board's creation, Poole implemented "Global Rule 15" (GR15), which banned pony content outside of a few select boards, directing all such discussions to /mlp/. The board became home to the "brony" fandom on 4chan, though many users on /mlp/ reject this label, preferring self-deprecating terms like horsefuckers or ponyfags. Notable events include a 2013 Q&A with Friendship Is Magic creator Lauren Faust and the board's temporary merger with /pol/ on April 1, 2017, creating "/mlpol/". Despite the original series ending in 2019, /mlp/ continues to maintain an active community. The board has been the subject of academic research regarding masculinity and online identity, particularly in a 2017 ethnographic study published in the journal Sexualities that examined how users construct collective identity around their interest in the show and its characters.

=== /mu/ ===
The music board, /mu/, is dedicated to the discussion of music artists, albums, genres, and instruments. Described as "4chan's best kept secret" and a "surprisingly artistic side of 4chan", /mu/ is used by users to share their music interests with similar minds and discover "great music they would never have found otherwise" with many moments of insightful candor that can affirm or challenge their own musical tastes. The board has gained notoriety for earnestly focusing upon and promoting challenging and otherwise obscure music. Some common genres discussed on /mu/ include shoegaze, experimental hip hop, witch house, IDM, midwest emo, vaporwave, and K-pop. There is a significant overlap between user bases of /mu/ and music site Rate Your Music. The board's culture has inspired many online music communities and meme pages on social media that emulate /mu/'s posting style.

Publications such as Pitchfork and Entertainment Weekly noted the board played a significant role in popularizing various music artists, such as Death Grips, Neutral Milk Hotel, Car Seat Headrest, and Have a Nice Life. Prominent music critic Anthony Fantano began his career on /mu/ and developed a significant following there. Some artists, like Zeal & Ardor and Conrad Tao, admitted to posting their music anonymously on /mu/ to get honest feedback, as well as find inspiration from the board. In particular, Zeal & Ardor said their sound, which mixes black metal with spirituals, came from suggestions by two users. Andrew W.K. did a Q&A with the board's users in 2011, causing the servers to crash from the increased traffic. Death Grips seeded various clues on /mu/ in 2012 about their then-upcoming albums The Money Store and No Love Deep Web. A rendition of "Royals" by Lorde appeared on /mu/ in 2012 before its official release, although she denied ever writing on the board in 2014. Singer Lauren Mayberry shared on Twitter in 2015 a link to a thread on /mu/ about her band's song "Leave a Trace" to showcase what online misogyny looks like. An alleged unreleased Radiohead song, titled "Putting Ketchup in the Fridge" and "How Do You Sit Still", was initially reported as genuine by NME and Spin until CNN revealed it was a hoax promoted by the board's users.

The board has been acknowledged for sharing rare music recordings and unreleased materials, as well as finding albums thought to be lost. Notable examples include the works of Duster, D>E>A>T>H>M>E>T>A>L by Panchiko, and All Lights Fucked on the Hairy Amp Drooling by Godspeed You! Black Emperor. This was described by NPR as resembling "a secret club of preservationists obsessed with the articulation of a near-dead language". The board has attracted further attention for various projects done by its users. A group called The Pablo Collective posted a 4-track remix album of Kanye West's The Life of Pablo titled The Death of Pablo to /mu/, claiming it was based on a recurring dream from one of the board's users. A role-playing game based on Neutral Milk Hotel's In the Aeroplane Over the Sea, designed with help from the board's users, received coverage from Polygon and Pitchfork.

=== /pol/ ===
/pol/ ("Politically Incorrect") is 4chan's political discussion board. A stickied thread on its front page states that the board's intended purpose is "discussion of news, world events, political issues, and other related topics." /pol/ was created in October 2011 as a rebranding of 4chan's news board, /new/, which was deleted that January for a high volume of racist discussion.

Although there had previously been a strong left-libertarian contingent to 4chan activists, there was a gradual rightward turn on 4chan's politics board in the early-mid 2010s, with the fundamentalist approach to free speech contributing. The board quickly attracted posters with a political persuasion that later would be described with a new term, the alt-right. Media sources have characterized /pol/ as predominantly racist and sexist, with many of its posts taking an explicitly neo-Nazi bent. The site's far-reaching culture of vitriolic and discriminatory content is "most closely associated" with /pol/, although only it features predominant Alt-Right beliefs; /pol/, like other boards, has been prominent in the dissemination of memes, in cases, featuring coordination to disperse Alt-Right sentiments. /pol/ "increasingly became synonymous with 4chan as a whole". The Southern Poverty Law Center regards /pol/'s rhetorical style as widely emulated by white supremacist websites such as The Daily Stormer; the Stormer's editor, Andrew Anglin, concurred. /pol/ was where screenshots of Trayvon Martin's hacked social media accounts were initially posted. The board's users have started antifeminist, homophobic, transphobic, and anti-Arab Twitter campaigns.

Many /pol/ users favored Donald Trump during his 2016 United States presidential campaign. Both Trump and his son, Donald Trump Jr., appeared to acknowledge the support by tweeting /pol/-associated memes. Upon his successful election, a /pol/ moderator embedded a pro-Trump video at the top of all of the board's pages.

=== /r9k/ ===
/r9k/ is a board that implements Randall Munroe's "ROBOT9000" algorithm, where no exact reposts are permitted. It is credited as the origin of the "greentext" rhetorical style which often center around stories of social interactions and resulting ineptness. By 2012, personal confession stories of self-loathing, depression, and attempted suicide began to supersede /b/-style roleplaying, otaku, and video game discussion.

It became a popular gathering place for the controversial online incel community. The "beta uprising" or "beta rebellion" meme, the idea of taking revenge against women, jocks and others perceived as the cause of incels' problems, was popularized on the subsection. The perpetrator of the Toronto van attack referenced 4chan and an incel rebellion in a Facebook post he made prior to the attack, while praising self-identified incel Elliot Rodger, the killer behind the 2014 Isla Vista killings. He claims to have talked with both Christopher Harper-Mercer and Rodger on Reddit and 4chan and believes that he was part of a "beta uprising", also posting a message on 4chan about his intention the day before his attack.

=== /sci/ ===
/sci/ is 4chan's science and mathematics board. On September 26, 2011, an anonymous user on /sci/ posted a question regarding the shortest possible way to watch all possible orders of episodes of the anime The Melancholy of Haruhi Suzumiya in nonchronological order. Shortly after, an anonymous user responded with a mathematical proof that argued viewers would have to watch at least 93,884,313,611 episodes to see all possible orderings. Seven years later, professional mathematicians recognized the mathematical proof as a partial solution to a superpermutations problem that was unsolved for 25 years. Australian mathematician Greg Egan later published a proof inspired by the proof from the anonymous 4chan user, both of which are recognized as significant advances to the problem.

=== /soc/ ===
/soc/ is 4chan's not-safe-for-work social board. It was launched in January 2011 after site founder Christopher Poole approved requests to move "rate my looks", webcam and other social threads off the high-traffic /b/ board into a dedicated space. Threads on /soc/ commonly feature "rate me" selfie evaluations and location-based posts intended to organize meet-ups. Posters frequently swap social media handles or Discord servers despite 4chan's usual emphasis on anonymity.

On July 21, 2023, an anonymous user posted a link to a self-made free and open source dating app, Duolicious, in a /soc/ thread. In May 2024, the app went viral, briefly outranking mainstream apps including eHarmony on Google Play's "Top for $0" dating category despite the app's creator stating "it was only meant to be a meme app". Mashable dubbed it "the 4chan dating app", describing it as "an amalgamation of other, better dating apps like Grindr and OkCupid."

=== /v/ ===
/v/ is 4chan's video games board. The board has spawned multiple Internet memes, most notably the NPC Wojak in 2016 (derived from the gaming term non-player character to describe those who do not think for themselves or make their own conscious decisions).

=== /x/ ===
The collaborative writing wiki-project SCP Foundation originated on /x/ in 2007.

The "paranormal" board, /x/, is dedicated to discussing topics regarding unexplained phenomena, the supernatural, and non-political conspiracy theories. /x/ was initially launched in January 2005 as 4chan's general photography board; in February 2007, it was repurposed as a paranormal-themed board.

Many of the earliest creepypastas (Internet horror-related legends) were created on /x/. The idea of the Backrooms gained popularity thanks to a thread on /x/ created on 12 May 2019, where the users were asked to "post disquieting images that just feel 'off'." There, the first photo depicting the Backrooms was uploaded and another user commented on it with the first story about the Backrooms, claiming that one enters the Backrooms when they "noclip out of reality in the wrong areas". After the 4chan post gained fame, several Internet users wrote horror stories relating to the Backrooms. Many memes were created and shared across social media, further popularizing the creepypasta.

American model Allison Harvard first gained notoriety in 2005 as an Internet meme on the /x/ board where she became known as Creepy Chan. Known for her large eyes and peculiar interests like fascination with blood, photos she posted on her blog were widely circulated on the board. She gained mainstream notoriety in 2009 and again in 2011 by appearing on America's Next Top Model. She would visit /x/ after new episodes of America's Next Top Model would air to see what was being written about her and participate in the discussions.

The SCP Foundation, a fictional secret organization documented by the collaborative writing wiki project of the same name, originated on /x/ in 2007, when the first SCP file, SCP-173, was posted by an anonymous user. Initially a stand-alone short story, many additional SCP files were created shortly after; these new SCPs copied SCP-173's style and were set within the same fictional universe. A stand-alone wiki was created in January 2008 on the EditThis wiki hosting service to display the SCP articles. The EditThis website did not have moderators, or the ability to delete articles. Members communicated through individual article talk pages and the /x/ board.

/x/ was the first place where the 2015 viral video 11B-X-1371 was posted. The board also contributed to investigating and popularizing the controversial Sad Satan video game.

== Internet culture ==
=== Memes ===
"[A] significant and influential element of contemporary internet culture", 4chan is responsible for many early memes and the site has received positive attention for its association with memes. This included "So I herd u liek mudkipz" [sic], which involved a phrase based on Mudkip, a creature from the Pokémon franchise, and which generated numerous YouTube tribute videos, and the term "an hero" [sic] as a synonym for suicide, after a misspelling in the Myspace online memorial of seventh grader Mitchell Henderson. 4chan and other websites, such as the satirical Encyclopedia Dramatica, have also contributed to the development of significant amounts of leetspeak.

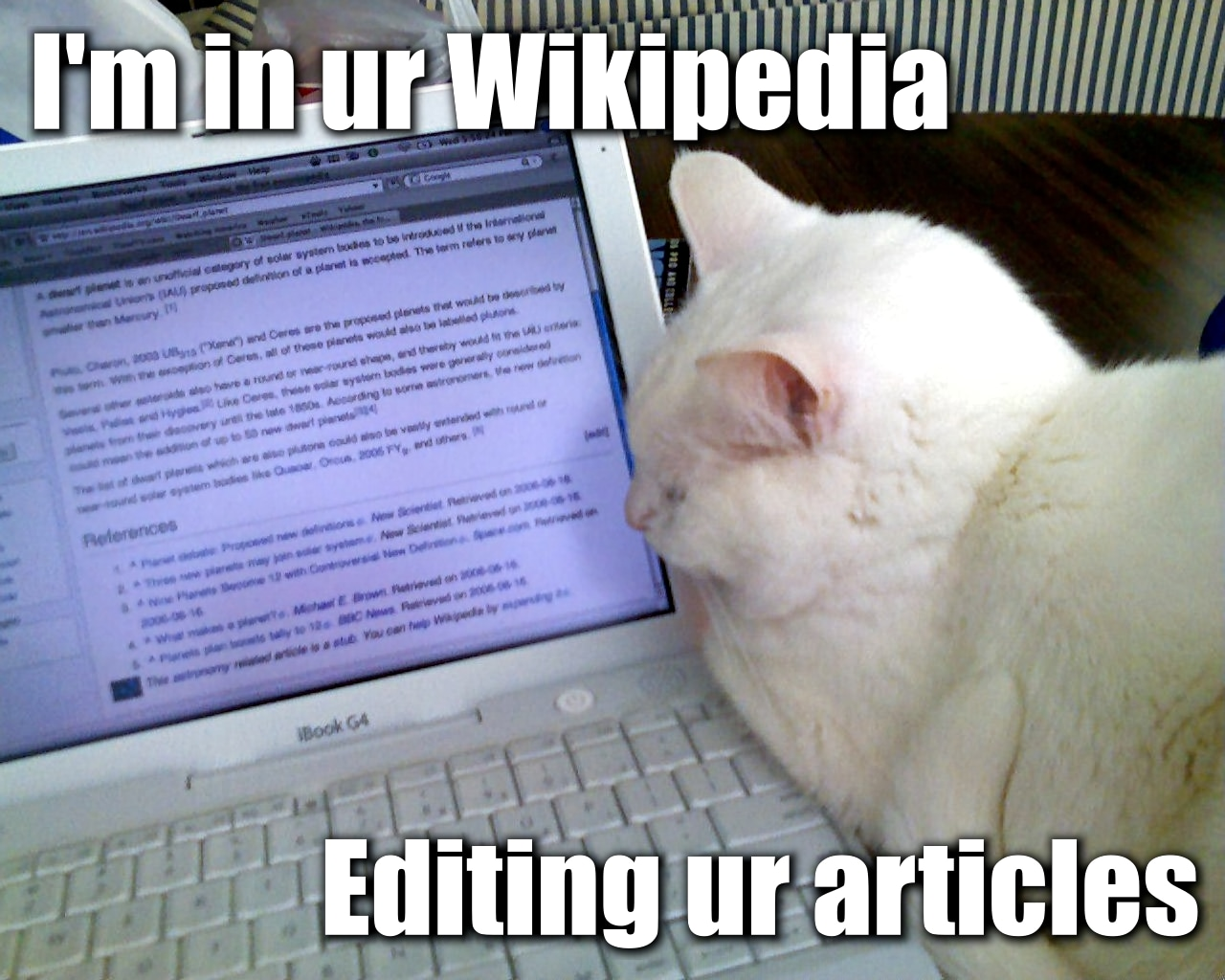
A lolcat image using the "I'm in ur..." format

A lolcat is an image combining a photograph of a cat with solecistic text intended to contribute humour, widely popularized by 4chan in the form of a weekly post dedicated to them and a corresponding theme.

In 2005, the installment of a word filter which changed "egg" to "duck", and thus "eggroll" to "duckroll", across 4chan led to a bait-and-switch meme in which users deceitfully linked to a picture of a duck on wheels. This was then modified into users linking to the music video for Rick Astley's 1987 song "Never Gonna Give You Up". Thus, the "rickroll" was born.

A link to the YouTube video of Tay Zonday's song "Chocolate Rain" was posted on /b/ on July 11, 2007, and then subsequently circulated by users, becoming a very popular internet meme. The portion of the song in which Zonday turns away from the microphone, with a caption stating "I move away from the mic to breathe in", became an oft-repeated meme on 4chan and inspired remixes. Fellow YouTuber Boxxy's popularity was also due in part to 4chan.

In July 2012, a minor fast food scandal took place in the United States, in which an anonymous Burger King employee posted a photo of himself standing in plastic bins filled with lettuce onto 4chan. Users on 4chan soon determined via the photo's Exif data that the image was taken at a Burger King location in Mayfield Heights, Ohio. This resulted in marked damage to Burger King's brand image online as well as the firing of three employees. The incident has repeatedly gone viral.

In his American incarnation, Pedobear is an anthropomorphic bear child predator that is often used within the community to mock contributors showing a sexual interest in children. Pedobear is one of the most popular memes on non-English imageboards, and has gained recognition across Europe, appearing in offline publications. It has been used as a symbol of pedophilia by Maltese graffiti vandals prior to a papal visit.

=== Anonymous and anti-Scientology activism ===
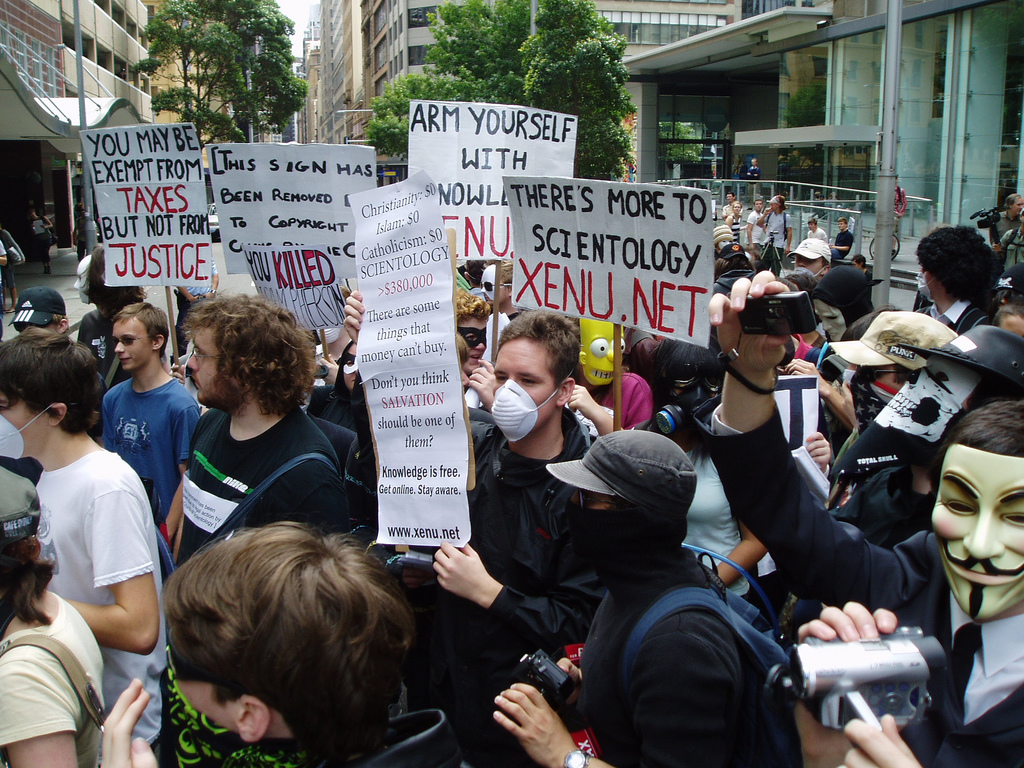
Protests against Scientology

4chan has been labeled as the starting point of the Anonymous meme by The Baltimore City Paper, due to the norm of posts signed with the "Anonymous" moniker. The National Post's David George-Cosh said it has been "widely reported" that Anonymous is associated with 4chan and 711chan, as well as numerous Internet Relay Chat (IRC) channels.

Through its association with Anonymous, 4chan has become associated with Project Chanology, a worldwide protest against the Church of Scientology held by members of Anonymous. On January 15, 2008, a 4chan user posted to /b/, suggesting participants "do something big" against the Church of Scientology's website. This message resulted in the Church receiving threatening phone calls. It quickly grew into a large real-world protest. Unlike previous Anonymous attacks, this action was characterized by 4chan memes, including rickrolls and Guy Fawkes masks. The raid drew criticism from some 4chan users who felt it would bring the site undesirable attention.

=== Brony fandom ===
The adult fandom and subculture dedicated to the children's animated television series My Little Pony: Friendship Is Magic began on the "Comics & Cartoons" (/co/) board of 4chan. The show was first discussed with some interest around its debut in October 2010. The users of /co/ took a heightened interest in the show after a critical Cartoon Brew article was shared, resulting in praise for its plot, characters, and animation style. Discussion of the show extended to /b/, eventually to a point of contention. Discussion then spread forth to communities external to 4chan, including the establishment of the fan websites, causing the show to reach a wider audience across the internet.

=== "This post is art" ===
On July 30, 2014, an anonymous user made a reply in a thread on the board /pol/ "Politically Incorrect" of 4chan, criticizing modern art in an ironic fashion, saying:

Art used to be something to cherish

Now literally anything could be art

This post is art.

— Anonymous

Less than an hour later the post was photographed off the screen and framed by another user who posted another reply in the thread with a photo of the framed quote. Later the user, after endorsement by other anonymous users in the thread, created an auction on eBay for the framed photo which quickly rose to high prices, culminating in a price of $90,900.

=== Pajeet ===
Pajeet, or Jeet, is a racial slur for Indian people, particularly adherents of Hinduism and Sikhism, originating on 4chan in 2015.

== Controversies and harassment incidents ==
=== Internet raids ===
Anonymous, a decentralized hacktivist movement that saw its origins from /b/

According to The Washington Post, "the site's users have managed to pull off some of the highest-profile collective actions in the history of the Internet."

Users of 4chan and other websites "raided" Hal Turner by launching denial-of-service attacks and prank calling his phone-in radio show during December 2006 and January 2007. The attacks caused Turner's website to go offline. This cost thousands of dollars in bandwidth bills according to Turner. In response, Turner sued 4chan, 7chan, and other websites; however, he lost his plea for an injunction and failed to receive letters from the court.

KTTV Fox 11 aired a report on Anonymous, calling them a group of "hackers on steroids", "domestic terrorists", and collectively an "Internet hate machine" on July 26, 2007. Slashdot founder Rob Malda posted a comment made by another Slashdot user, Miang, stating that the story focused mainly on users of "4chan, 7chan and 420chan". Miang claimed that the report "seems to confuse /b/ raids and motivational poster templates with a genuine threat to the American public", arguing that the "unrelated" footage of a van exploding shown in the report was to "equate anonymous posting with domestic terror".

On July 10, 2008, the swastika CJK unicode character (卐) appeared at the top of Google's Hot Trends list—a tally of the most used search terms in the United States—for several hours. It was later reported that the HTML numeric character reference for the symbol had been posted on /b/, with a request to perform a Google search for the string. A multitude of /b/ visitors followed the order and pushed the symbol to the top of the chart, though Google later removed the result.

Later that year, the private Yahoo! Mail account of Sarah Palin, Republican vice presidential candidate in the 2008 United States presidential election, was hacked by a 4chan user. The hacker posted the account's password on /b/, and screenshots from within the account to WikiLeaks. A /b/ user then logged in and changed the password, posting a screenshot of him sending an email to a friend of Palin's informing her of the new password on the /b/ thread. However, he forgot to blank out the password in the screenshot. A multitude of /b/ users attempted to log in with the new password, and the account was automatically locked out by Yahoo!. The incident was criticized by some /b/ users. One user commented, "seriously, /b/. We could have changed history and failed, epically." The FBI and Secret Service began investigating the incident shortly after its occurrence. On September 20 it was revealed they were questioning David Kernell, the son of Democratic Tennessee State Representative Mike Kernell.

The stock price of Apple Inc. fell significantly in October 2008 after a hoax story was submitted to CNN's user-generated news site iReport.com claiming that company CEO Steve Jobs had suffered a major heart attack. The source of the story was traced back to 4chan.

In May 2009, members of the site attacked YouTube, posting pornographic videos on the video-sharing platform under names of teenage celebrities. The attack spawned the popular Internet meme and catchphrase "I'm 12 years old and what is this?" as a response to a user comment on one such video. A 4chan member acknowledged being part of the attack, telling BBC News that it was in response to YouTube "deleting music". In January 2010, members of the site attacked YouTube again in response to the suspension of YouTube user lukeywes1234 for failing to meet the minimum age requirement of thirteen. The videos uploaded by the user had apparently become popular with 4chan members, who subsequently became angered after the account was suspended and called for a new wave of pornographic videos to be uploaded to YouTube on January 6, 2010. Later the same year, 4chan made numerous disruptive pranks directed at singer Justin Bieber.

In September 2010, in retaliation against the Bollywood film industry's hiring of Aiplex Software to launch cyberattacks against The Pirate Bay, Anonymous members, recruited through posts on 4chan boards, subsequently initiated their own attacks, dubbed Operation Payback, targeting the website of the Motion Picture Association of America and the Recording Industry Association of America. The targeted websites usually went offline for a short period of time due to the attacks, before recovering.

The website of the UK law firm ACS:Law, which was associated with an anti-piracy client, was affected by the cyber-attack. In retaliation for the initial attacks being called only a minor nuisance, Anonymous launched more attacks, bringing the site down yet again. After coming back up, the front page accidentally revealed a backup file of the entire website, which contained over 300 megabytes of private company emails, which were leaked to several torrents and across several sites on the Internet. It was suggested that the data leak could cost the law firm up to £500,000 in fines for breaching British Data Protection Laws.

In January 2011, BBC News reported that the law firm announced they were to stop "chasing illegal file-sharers". Head of ACS:Law Andrew Crossley in a statement to a court addressed issues which influenced the decision to back down "I have ceased my work ... I have been subject to criminal attack. My e-mails have been hacked. I have had death threats and bomb threats."

In August 2012, 4chan users attacked a third-party sponsored Mountain Dew campaign, Dub the Dew, where users were asked to submit and vote on name ideas for a green apple flavor of the drink. Users submitted entries such as "Diabeetus", "Fapple", several variations of "Gushing Granny", and "Hitler did nothing wrong".

=== Threats of violence ===
On October 18, 2006, the Department of Homeland Security warned National Football League officials in Miami, New York City, Atlanta, Seattle, Houston, Oakland, and Cleveland about a possible threat involving the simultaneous use of dirty bombs at stadiums. The threat claimed that the attack would be carried out on October 22, the final day of the Muslim holy month of Ramadan. Both the FBI and the Department of Homeland Security expressed doubt concerning the credibility of the threats, but warned the relevant organizations as a precaution. The threat turned out to be an ill-conceived hoax perpetrated by a grocery store clerk in Wisconsin with no terrorist ties. The FBI considered it a clearly frivolous threat and the 20-year-old man was charged with fabricating a terrorist threat, sentenced to six months in prison followed by six months' house arrest, and ordered to pay $26,750 in restitution.

Hello, /b/. On September 11, 2007, at 9:11 am Central time, two pipe bombs will be remote-detonated at Pflugerville High School. Promptly after the blast, I, along with two ther [sic] Anonymous, will charge the building, armed with a Bushmaster AR-15, IMI Galil AR, a vintage, government-issue M1 .30 Carbine, and a Benelli M4 semi auto shotgun.

— The Pflugerville threat

Around midnight on September 11, 2007, a student posted photographs of mock pipe bombs and another photograph of him holding them while saying he would blow up his high school—Pflugerville High School in Pflugerville, Texas—at 9:11 am on September 11. Users of 4chan helped to track him down by finding the perpetrator's father's name in the Exif data of a photograph he took, and contacted the police. He was arrested before school began that day. The incident turned out to be a hoax; the "weapons" were toys and there were no actual bombs.

A 20-year-old from Melbourne, Australia, was arrested on December 8, 2007, after apparently posting on 4chan that he was "going to shoot and kill as many people as I can until which time I am incapacitated or killed by the police". The post, accompanied by an image of another man holding a shotgun, threatened a shopping mall near Beverly Hills. While the investigation was still open, he was charged with criminal defamation for a separate incident but died before the case was heard.

On February 4, 2009, a posting on the 4chan /b/ board said there would be a school shooting at St Eskils Gymnasium in Eskilstuna, Sweden, leading 1,250 students and 50 teachers to be evacuated. A 21-year-old man was arrested after 4chan provided the police with the IP address of the poster. Police said that the suspect called it off as a joke, and they released him after they found no indication that the threat was serious.

On June 28, 2018, a man was arrested following an indictment by the U.S. Department of Justice "on one count of transmitting in interstate and foreign commerce a threat to injure the person of another." The indictment alleged that he posted anonymously to /pol/ the day after the Unite the Right rally, communicating an intention to attack protestors at an upcoming right-wing demonstration, ostensibly to elicit sympathy for the alt-right movement. "I'm going to bring a Remington 700 and start shooting Alt-right guys. We need sympathy after that landwhale got all the liberals teary-eyed, so someone is going to have to make it look like the left is becoming more violent and radicalized. It's a false flag for sure, but I'll be aiming for the more tanned/dark-haired muddied jeans in the crowd so real whites won't have to worry," he wrote, according to the indictment.

In 2023, a 38-year-old of Monmouth Junction, New Jersey was arrested for threatening Volusia County, Florida, Sheriff Mike Chitwood on 4chan due to Chitwood's condemnation of antisemitism. According to authorities, the poster, who lived 974 miles away from Volusia County, advocated "shoot[ing] Chitwood in the head and murder[ing] him" in a February 22 post.

In April of that same year, two other 4chan users, residents of California and Connecticut respectively, were also arrested for threatening to kill Chitwood on 4chan.

On the evening of April 2 and morning of April 3, 2024, two threats were posted on 4chan claiming there was a bomb in the Norwegian parliament building. Oslo police closed down the parliament building while the Norwegian Police Security Service carried out an investigation. No bomb was found in the building. The culprit behind the threats was not identified and nobody was arrested in relation to the case.

=== Celebrity photo leaks ===
On August 31, 2014, a compromise of user passwords at iCloud allowed a large number of private photographs taken by celebrities to be posted online, initially on 4chan. As a result of the incident, 4chan announced that it would enforce a Digital Millennium Copyright Act policy, which would allow content owners to remove material that had been shared on the site illegally, and would ban users who repeatedly posted stolen material.

=== Gamergate ===
Also in August 2014, 4chan was involved in the Gamergate controversy, which began with unsubstantiated allegations about indie game developer Zoë Quinn from an ex-boyfriend, followed by false allegations from anonymous Internet users. The allegations were followed by a harassment campaign against several women in the video game industry, organized by 4chan users, particularly /r9k/. Discussion regarding Gamergate was banned on 4chan due to alleged rule violations, and Gamergate supporters moved to alternate forums such as 8chan.

=== Murder in Port Orchard, Washington ===
According to court documents filed on November 5, 2014, there were images posted to 4chan that appeared to be of a murder victim. The body was discovered in Port Orchard, Washington, after the images were posted. The posts were accompanied by the text: "Turns out it's way harder to strangle someone to death than it looks on the movies." A later post said: "Check the news for Port Orchard, Washington, in a few hours. Her son will be home from school soon. He'll find her, then call the cops. I just wanted to share the pics before they find me." The victim was Amber Lynn Coplin, aged 30. The suspect, 33-year-old David Michael Kalac, surrendered to police in Oregon later the same day; he was charged with second-degree murder involving domestic violence. Kalac was convicted in April 2017 and was sentenced to 82 years in prison the following month.

=== Death of Jeffrey Epstein ===
A report of Jeffrey Epstein's death was posted on /pol/ around 40 minutes before ABC News broke the news. It was originally suspected that the unidentified person who made the posts may have been a first responder, prompting a review by the New York City Fire Department, who later stated that the post did not come from a member of its department.

=== 2022 Buffalo shooting ===
On May 14, 2022, a mass shooting occurred at a supermarket in Buffalo, New York, US. The accused, Payton S. Gendron, is reported to have written a racist manifesto released May 12 (two days before the shooting), with the manifesto including birth date and other biographical details that match the suspect in custody. In the manifesto the author writes that in May 2020 he began to frequent 4chan, including its "Politically Incorrect" message board /pol/, where he was introduced to the Great Replacement conspiracy theory.

=== 2025 investigation by British government ===
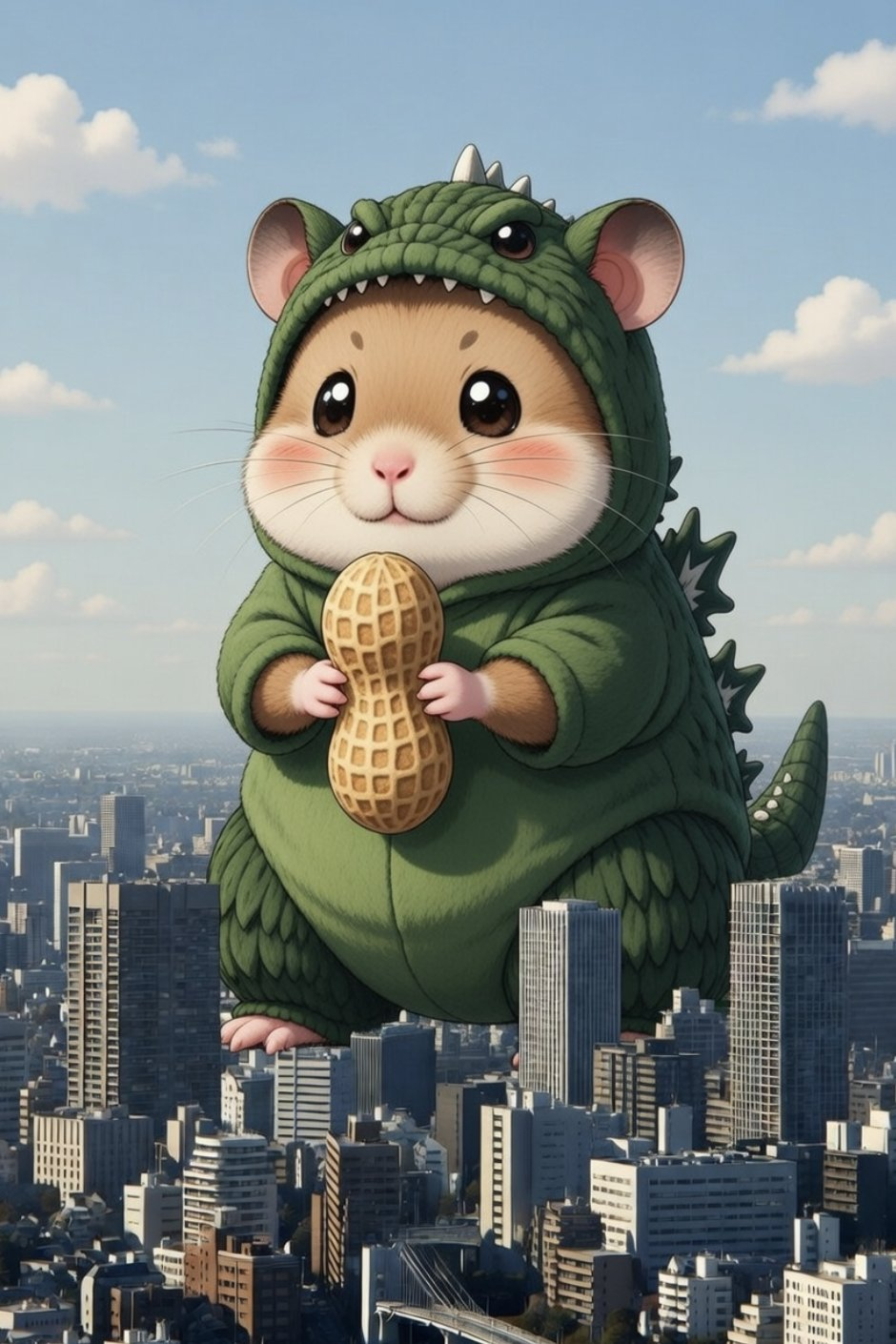
In response to a £520,000 fine from UK online safety regulator Ofcom, 4chan’s lawyer Preston Byrne sent this AI-generated image of giant hamster "Nigel J. Whiskerford", saying that the creature would be receiving the fine

On June 10, 2025, Ofcom, the British government's communications regulator, announced an investigation into 4chan for potential violations of the Online Safety Act 2023 (OSA), which took effect in the United Kingdom in April 2025. According to BBC News, "Ofcom says it requested 4chan's risk assessment in April but has not had any response." The news agency also reported, "Ofcom has the power to fine companies up to 10% of their global revenues, or £18m — whichever is the greater number."

On August 13, 2025, Ofcom issued a provisional decision, finding that 4chan had contravened its duties under the OSA by failing to comply with two information requests from the regulator. 4chan's lawyer issued a statement that the website "will not pay any penalty". He also stated, "American businesses do not surrender their First Amendment rights because a foreign bureaucrat sends them an email". On August 27, 2025, 4chan along with Kiwi Farms filed a lawsuit against Ofcom in the United States. Ofcom initially responded, "We are aware of this lawsuit. Under the Online Safety Act, any service that has links with the UK now has duties to protect UK users, no matter where in the world it is based."

On 19 March 2026, Ofcom issued 4chan a £450,000 fine for failing to implement age checks in line with the OSA. It also fined the site a further £20,000 for not specifying how users are protected from illegal content, and £50,000 for not carrying out an illegal content risk assessment. Ofcom set a deadline for 4chan to amend these breaches by April 2, after which they plan to impose daily fines for each breach of the OSA, totaling £900 per day. In response to the fine, 4chan's lawyer sent Ofcom an AI-generated image of a hamster and said, "In the only country in which 4chan operates, the United States, it is breaking no law and indeed its conduct is expressly protected by the First Amendment."

== ISP bans ==
=== AT&T temporary ban ===
On July 26, 2009, AT&T's DSL branch temporarily blocked access to the img.4chan.org domain (host of /b/ and /r9k/), which was initially believed to be an attempt at Internet censorship, and met with hostility on 4chan's part. The next day, AT&T issued a statement claiming that the block was put in place after an AT&T customer was affected by a DoS attack originating from IP addresses connected to img.4chan.org, and was an attempt to "prevent this attack from disrupting service for the impacted AT&T customer, and... our other customers." AT&T maintains that the block was not related to the content on 4chan.

4chan's founder Christopher Poole responded with the following:

In the end, this wasn't a sinister act of censorship, but rather a bit of a mistake and a poorly executed, disproportionate response on AT&T's part. Whoever pulled the trigger on blackholing the site probably didn't anticipate [nor intend] the consequences of doing so. We're glad to see this short-lived debacle has prompted renewed interest and debate over net neutrality and Internet censorship—two very important issues that don't get nearly enough attention—so perhaps this was all just a blessing in disguise.

Major news outlets have reported that the issue may be related to the DDoS-ing of 4chan, and that 4chan users suspected the then-owner of Swedish-based website Anontalk.com.

=== Verizon temporary ban ===
On February 4, 2010, 4chan started receiving reports from Verizon Wireless customers that they were having difficulties accessing the site's image boards. After investigating, Poole found out that only the traffic on port 80 to the boards.4chan.org domain was affected, leading members to believe that the block was intentional. Three days later, Verizon Wireless confirmed that 4chan was "explicitly blocked". The block was lifted several days later.

=== Telstra ban ===
On March 20, 2019, Australian telecom company Telstra denied access to millions of Australians to 4chan, 8chan, Zero Hedge, and LiveLeak as a reaction to the Christchurch mosque shootings.

=== New Zealand ===
Following the Christchurch mosque shootings, numerous ISPs temporarily blocked any site hosting a copy of the livestream of the shooting, including 4chan. The ISPs included Spark, Vodafone, Vocus, and 2degrees.

== See also ==
- List of Internet phenomena
- Pepe the Frog

International:

- 8kun/8chan, America
- Dvach (2ch), Russia
- Ylilauta, Finland
- 2channel, Japan
- Ilbe Storehouse, South Korea
