= /v/ (imageboard) =

Videogames discussion board on 4chan

/v/ – Video Games

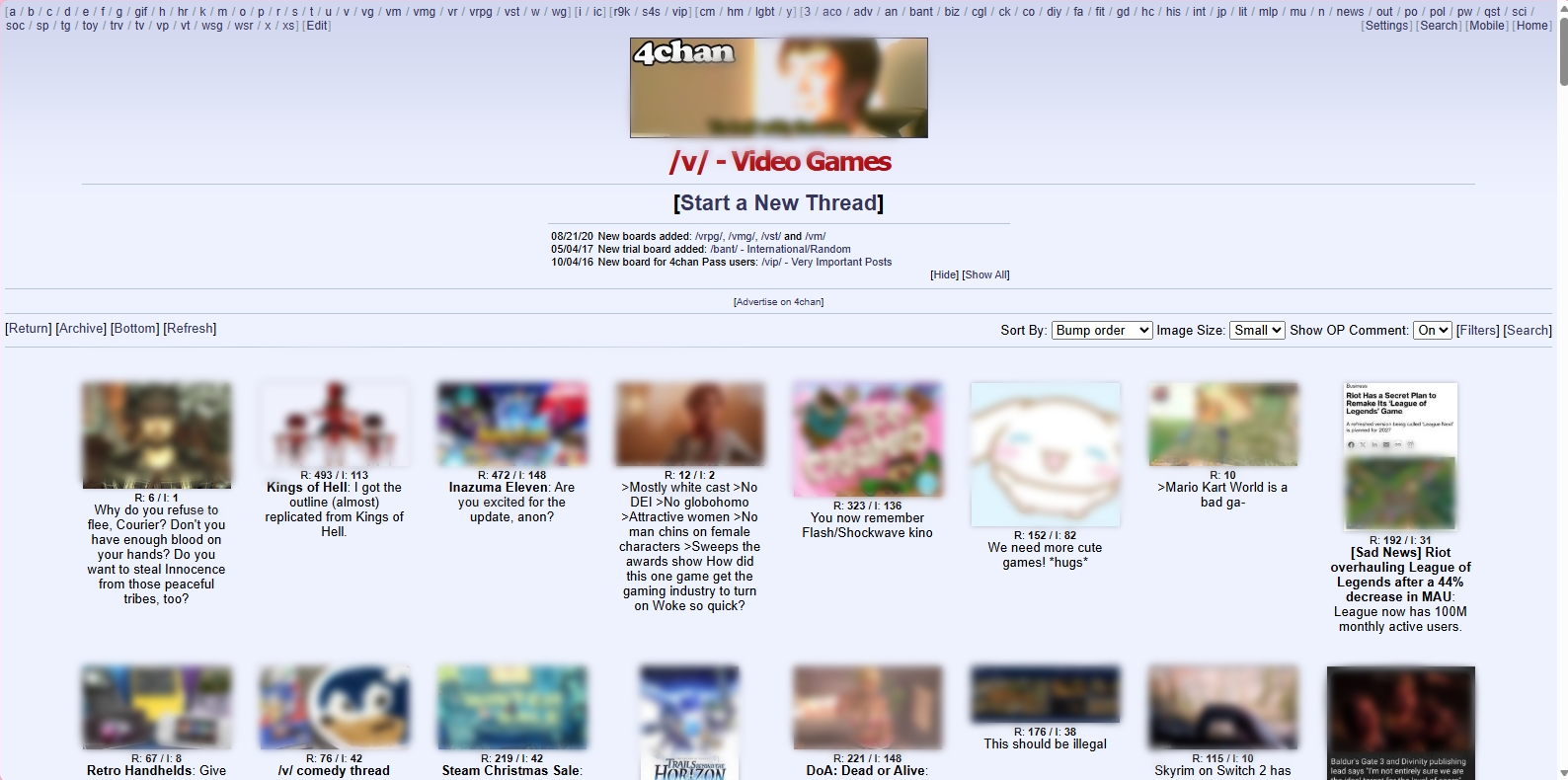
- Screenshot of the catalogue of the /v/ board as of 19 December 2025
- Website type: 4chan imageboard
- Available in: English
- Owner: Hiroyuki Nishimura
- Founder: Christopher "moot" Poole
- Website: 4chan.org/v/
- Commercial: Yes
- Registration: Optional
- Launched: October 2004; 22 years ago
- Current status: Online

/v/, short for Video Games, is an anonymous imageboard on 4chan for discussing video games, consoles, and related topics. Created in October 2004, the board has influenced internet culture through a series of Internet memes, the most notable of which being the controversial NPC Wojak in 2016. It has also attracted much criticism for the userbase's involvement in the Gamergate harassment campaign in 2014 and 2015.

== Background ==
4chan was launched on 1 October 2003 by Christopher Poole, a then-15-year-old student from New York City using the online handle "moot". At its founding, the site only hosted one board: /b/ (Anime/Random). It was advertised as an English-language counterpart to Futaba Channel and a place for Western fans to discuss anime and manga.

On 9 October 2004, the addition of several boards were announced; /ib/ (Oekaki Random, now defunct), /ip/ (Oekaki Pro, now defunct), /tech/ (Technology, now called /g/) and /v/ (Video Games). By 2021, the board was the second most active only behind /pol/. Other video game related boards also exist; /vg/ (Video Game Generals, dedicated to game franchises), /vm/ (Video Games/Multiplayer, for multiplayer video games), /vmg/ (Video Games/Mobile, for mobile video games), /vp/ (Pokémon), /vr/ (Retro Games), /vrpg/ (Video Games/RPG, for Role-playing video games) and /vst/ (Video Games/Strategy, for strategy video games).

== Culture and influence ==
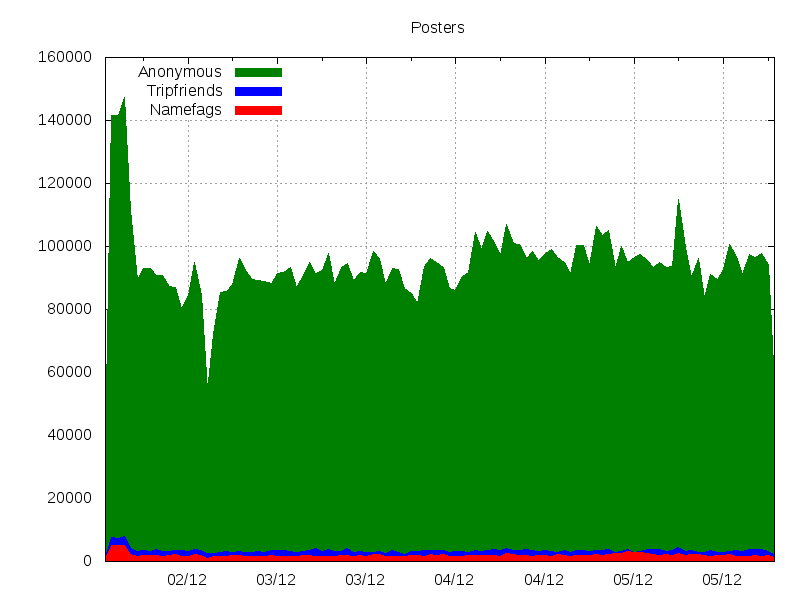
A graph of the userbase of the /v/ board between January and June 2012. Green represents anonymous users, blue those who post with a tripcode, and red those who do under an alias.

In the early years of the board, "is this Battletoads?" was a common response to any video game screenshot shared in the site, this later spread to /b/ and starting in 2007, trolls began calling GameStop stores asking for pre-order copies of a sequel that at the time didn't exist, as a new game wouldn't appear until Battletoads (2020). These calls, frequently vulgar in tone, continued into 2010 to the frustration of local employees, some of whom would become enraged at the mention of the game. Other organizations with no ties to video games, like the Church of Scientology, also received these prank calls.

Beginning in early 2011, the 4chan pranksters targeted the Gold and Silver pawn shop, home to the popular television show Pawn Stars. The callers would repeatedly ask the employees if they sold Battletoads. This led Rick Harrison, star of Pawn Stars and owner of the store, to repeatedly swear and yell at the callers, who recorded this and uploaded it to YouTube. Battletoads developer Rare has acknowledged the prank via an achievement named "Do You Have Battletoads?" in their 2015 game compilation Rare Replay.

While the video game Minecraft was in its early stage of development, its creator Markus "Notch" Persson promoted the game in 4chan, among other places. The video game was subject of discussion in the /v/ board and this contributed to its spread and popularity. As an acknowledgement of the board, "Notch" added the phrase "Woo, /v/!" to one of the title screen's rotating splash messages in a 2010 Java build of the game. Similar references to other websites like Facepunch, Something Awful and TIGSource were also done. This reference never appeared outside the Java version of the game, and was present for over a decade. Only on Java Edition 1.17, launched on 27 May 2021, was the splash message quietly removed with no mention in the patch notes. According to Kotaku contributor Ian Walker, this was done by Microsoft (owner of Minecraft since 2014) in order to distance the company from the legacy of the game's creator.

Since 2011, /v/ has been represented in an online event known as the 4chan Cup: a series of online football matches between different teams that represent each board with their own culture and memes. Using heavily modded versions of different Pro Evolution Soccer video games, the matches are automated (computer-vs-computer) but each team is managed by a human player. The first edition, in which /v/ was already present, took place in August 2011 and is still ongoing as of today, with new boards, divisions and cups being added over the years. Video game journalist João Pedro Boaventura described the 4chan Cup as "an interesting event because it also concerns not only the ability of video games to foster unusual situations, but also its ability to promote a kind of bizarre camaraderie among peers who manage to organize themselves anonymously for a single objective, a goal that was boosted by the advent of the internet."

NPC Wojak in its simplest iteration, created by an anonymous /v/ user

Users in the board are sometimes referred to as /v/irgins. The board has spawned multiple Internet memes, most notably the NPC Wojak in 2016 (derived from the gaming term non-player character to describe those who do not think for themselves or make their own conscious decisions). It was covered by major and minor news outlets alike, with frequent coverage during its popularity peak in fall 2018. According to The Verge, a few articles (including one by The New York Times published on October 16, 2018) sparked a "domino effect" and led to increased spread of the meme on Twitter, YouTube and through articles.

== Gamergate controversy ==
"Vivian James" character created by an anonymous /v/ user. Frequently used as feminine personification of the board.

The user base of the /v/ board was heavily involved within the Gamergate controversy. The hashtag #notyourshield originated within the board as a response to the criticism of misogyny. According to Torill Elvira Mortensen, "#notyourshield was supposed to show that female and non-White gamers did not want more diversity in games, stopping critics of game culture from using them as an excuse for more diversity." After discussions of Gamergate were banned in 4chan by "moot" in late September 2014, most users active in the campaign moved to 8chan.

During the event, 4chan users and specially /v/ users, supported the Indiegogo project of the group The Fine Young Capitalists (TFYC), which sponsored a video game design contest for women in 2014, founded with the goal of helping women and other underrepresented groups get involved in video game design. As reward for the highest type of donation ($2,000 USD or more), the donors could submit a character design that would be added to the video game. Through /v/ in what was called "Operation Chemo Butthurt" (in reference to how part of the money was going to be given to The Colon Cancer Alliance), the pro-#gamergate 4chan users became the highest contributors to TFYC, raising over $23,000 USD. Afterwards, the character design called "Vivian James", created by an anonymous /v/ user, was added to Afterlife Empire. According to Mahli-Ann Butt and Tom Apperley, "Vivian James emerged from an ad hoc collection of individuals who believed that it was appropriate to harass female game developers, who also thought that they needed to suggest a more inclusive image for #gamergate in order to avoid bad press."

== See also ==
- /b/ – Imageboard or online forum on 4chan
- /pol/ – Political discussion board on 4chan
- /mlp/ – My Little Pony: Friendship Is Magic discussion board on 4chan
- /mu/ – Music discussion board on 4chan
- Video game culture – Worldwide subculture
