= Bato (website) =

Chinese file hosting website

Bato (also Bato.to, Batoto and Mangapark) was a website that hosted manga, manhwa and manhua (Japanese, Korean and Chinese comics) for free. For a time it was the world's largest manga piracy website, with an estimated 350 million visits in May 2025. It was launched in 2014, operated from China and shut down in late January 2026.

It hosted works translated into more than 50 languages, including numerous user-uploaded scanlations. The website did not allow access from users in China to prevent drawing attention from local authorities. Because of the illegal nature of the operation, the website was targeted by organizations such as Japan's Content Overseas Distribution Association and Korea's Kakao Entertainment. The site's operator is facing criminal charges, and cease-and-desist letters were sent to community members such as social media administrators associated with the website in order to produce a chilling effect and discourage use of the website.

== See also ==
- Nyaa Torrents – File sharing website focused on East Asian media
- MangaDex – Manga aggregation website
- Mangamura – Japanese manga piracy website
