= Nicholas Lim (entrepreneur) =

Technology entrepreneur

- Born: 1997 or 1998 (age 28–29)
- Occupations: Entrepreneur, software developer

Nicholas Lim (born 1997 or 1998) is a technology entrepreneur and software developer based in Vancouver, Washington. Lim and his companies provide services to alt-tech, far-right and neo-Nazi websites, such as The Daily Stormer, a neo-Nazi message board website, 8chan, the home of the far-right QAnon conspiracy theory, and Kiwi Farms, a harassment and anti-trans forum. In 2017, Lim founded BitMitigate, a website security company which in 2019 was acquired by Epik, an America-based registrar and hosting company. In 2019, he founded VanwaTech, a webhosting and website security company.

== Career ==
One of Lim's early projects was OrcaTech, a service he says was intended to be used by website owners to test their websites' abilities to withstand distributed denial-of-service (DDoS) attacks. The website was also able to be used to levy DDoS attacks against others; Lim said he never investigated whether it was used in harmful ways.

After dropping out of college, Lim founded BitMitigate in 2017 in Vancouver, Washington, when he was nineteen years old. The company provided website security services, including protection from DDoS attacks. Beginning in August 2017, BitMitigate provided security services to The Daily Stormer, a neo-Nazi website which had just been denied service by Cloudflare after publishing an article mocking Heather Heyer, the victim of a vehicle ramming attack at the white supremacist Unite the Right rally in Charlottesville, Virginia earlier that month. Lim contacted The Daily Stormer's founder, Andrew Anglin, after hearing he was having trouble staying online, and offered him free use of BitMitigate's services. Lim told ProPublica in August 2017 that he thought offering services to The Daily Stormer "would really get my service out there". In 2018, Lim began to be mentored by Rob Monster, the founder and CEO of the web services company Epik.

BitMitigate was still providing services to The Daily Stormer in February 2019, when they were acquired by Epik. As a result of the acquisition, Lim became Epik's chief technology officer. By that time, both BitMitigate and Epik had become known for servicing far-right and neo-Nazi websites which had been denied service by other internet services providers. Monster said in a 2021 interview with NPR that when Epik discovered they were providing services to The Daily Stormer, they stopped doing so. Monster said that Epik's connection to the site was "regrettable", and that "the greatest cost of acquiring BitMitigate was not the amount of cash that we paid to buy the technology, but the entanglement."

In August 2019, BitMitigate began providing services to 8chan, an imageboard forum that is home to the far-right QAnon conspiracy theory and which has been linked to multiple mass shootings. BitMitigate took 8chan as a customer shortly after the forum was dropped by Cloudflare following three mass shootings (Christchurch, New Zealand, in March; Poway, California, in April; El Paso, Texas, in August) in which the perpetrators each used 8chan to spread extremist messages. BitMitigate's decision to provide services to 8chan resulted in Voxility, a web services company that had been renting servers to BitMitigate and Epik, terminating their relationship with both companies. This brought 8chan back offline, as well as some other Epik customers, and Monster decided to stop providing services to 8chan shortly afterwards.

=== VanwaTech ===
In approximately August 2019, Lim left Epik and announced that he had created VanwaTech, a web hosting and website security company also based in Vancouver, Washington. Through VanwaTech, Lim again began providing services to The Daily Stormer and to 8chan. According to Lim, he remained a partial owner of Epik after his departure as CTO. Jim Watkins, who owns 8chan, is also reportedly involved in VanwaTech.

On September 6, 2022, Lim confirmed that VanwaTech had begun providing CDN services to the forum Kiwi Farms, a site previously dropped by Cloudflare and DDoS-Guard following protests related to the doxxing and harassment of Clara Sorrenti. Lim stated, "We maintain a firm commitment to our role as a neutral provider of internet services and not an internet censor."

In approximately May 2023, VanwaTech suspended all services and disabled their interface. The website displayed the message, "VanwaTech LLC has suspended all services. This status page is a temporary courtesy and will be shut down soon." It was later updated to include, "Our terms of service reserve the right for us to terminate users of our services at our sole discretion".

== Views ==
Lim has said that his choices to provide services to far-right clients who have been denied services by other internet providers are not based in support of their views, but a "maximalist" belief in freedom of speech. Lim has said that he believes restrictions on online speech are a greater danger to the United States than extremist violence, and that "we are one foot away from Nineteen Eighty-Four".

William Turton and Joshua Brustein writing in Bloomberg Businessweek said of Lim's defense of his extremist clientele, "At best, his apolitical framing comes across as naive; at worst, as preposterous gaslighting".

In an April 2021 interview, Lim expressed intent to pivot in some ways away from serving predominantly extremist organizations, and instead to focus on providing services to pornographic websites.
