= Mangamura =

Japanese manga piracy website

- Native name: 漫画村
- Website type: Online piracy
- Available in: Japanese
- Founded: January 2016
- Dissolved: April 2018
- Country of origin: Japan
- Owner: Romi Hoshino (星野 ロミ)
- Commercial: Yes
- Registration: Optional

Mangamura (漫画村; lit. 'manga village') was a Japanese piracy website that primarily hosted Japanese manga. Besides manga, it also hosted pirated copies of magazines and photo-books. It was shut down in April 2018.

== Launch and rise to popularity ==
The site was launch in January 2016 by Romi Hoshino (星野 ロミ) or his pen name Zakay Romi.

Mangamura spiked in popularity in 2017. According to Similarweb, an estimated 98 million people visited the website in January 2018, placing it the thirty-first most visited website in Japan that month. Content Overseas Distribution Association (CODA), an association of Japanese copyright-holding companies, said that the site had been accessed about 620 million times between September 2017 and February 2018, and claimed that this had caused ¥319.2 billion (2021) (US$2.91 billion) worth of damages to copyright holders in Japan.

In 2017, Kodansha and multiple other publishers filed a criminal complaint against Mangamura for alleged violation of the copyright law of Japan. In February 2018, Manga Japan (マンガジャパン), an association of manga artists, issued a statement urging people not to visit the website.

In March 2018, Mangamura announced its paid subscription plan named Mangamura Pro (漫画村プロ).

== Shutdown and arrest ==
On April 13, 2018, the Japanese government announced its plans to begin considering measures to block traffic to piracy sites from the country, and requested internet service providers in the country to stop providing access to the three piracy sites named, including Mangamura. This move was criticized by a number of legal professionals and ISP industry groups, including the Japan Internet Providers Association, who deemed it in violation of the right to secrecy of communications guaranteed by Article 21 of the Japanese constitution. On April 17, the Mangamura website became inaccessible. It has been speculated that operator of the website may have closed it themselves.

On May 14 the same year, multiple major news outlets reported that the Fukuoka Prefectural Police had opened a criminal investigation into the website on suspicion of copyright infringement. On July 7, 2019, operator of Mangamura, Romi Hoshino (星野 ロミ), was caught by the National Bureau of Investigation in the Philippines. Wataru Adachi, another person associated with the site, as well as Hoshino's friends Kōta Fujisaki and Shiho Itō were arrested in August 2019. Fujisaki pleaded guilty, while Itō pleaded innocent in their arraignment in September 2019. On June 2, 2021, the Fukuoka District Court found Hoshino guilty of violating the copyright law and other charges, and sentenced him to three years in prison.

In 2020, the Japan Cartoonists Association issued a joint statement with Shuppan Koho Center (出版広報センター) in favor of revising the Japanese copyright law to make it illegal to download pirated materials in order to protect young artists from piracy.

== Lawsuit ==
In July 2022, Japanese publishers Shogakukan, Shueisha and Kadokawa filed a lawsuit against the site for ¥1.9 billion (2022) (US$14.45 million) at the Tokyo District Court. The number represents estimated damages to the company from piracy of 441 volumes from 17 manga. (Note: The manga mentioned in the lawsuit are One Piece, Kingdom, YAWARA!, Dorohedoro, Overlord, Sgt. Frog, Wise Man's Grandchild, The Rising of the Shield Hero, Trinity Seven, Hinamatsuri, Erased, Mushoku Tensei, Golden Rough, Kanojo wa Uso o Ai Shisugiteru, Karakuri Circus, Kengan Ashura, and Tasogare Ryūseigun.)

On April 17, 2024, The Tokyo District Court ordered the former owner of the site to pay the Japanese Publishers Shogakukan, Shueisha and Kadokawa ¥1.7 billion (US$15.49 million).

== See also ==
- Bato (website) – Chinese file hosting website
- MangaDex – Manga aggregation website
