= Epik =

American web services company

Epik, LLC.
- Type: Private
- Industry: Web services
- Founded: 2009; 17 years ago
- Founder: Rob Monster
- Headquarters: Sheridan, Wyoming, U.S.
- Area served: Worldwide
- Key people: Brian Royce (CEO, 2022–2023); Robert Monster (CEO, 2009–2022)
- Services: Domain name registration, web hosting
- Parent: Registered Agents Inc.
- Subsidiaries: Epik Holdings, Inc.
- Website: www.epik.com

Epik is an American domain registrar and web hosting company based in Sheridan, Wyoming. Founded by Rob Monster in 2009, Epik marketed itself as the "Swiss bank of domains" and, in 2018, was one of the few US-based registrars that had a history of not responding to reports of illegal activity, according to Wired. The company has provided services to alt-tech platforms hosting far-right content, and had been characterized as a "safe haven for the extreme right" by critics due to its support for sites deplatformed by other providers.

Some of Epik's notable clients have included social network Gab and the imageboard website 8chan. In 2021, the social network Parler moved its domain registration to Epik after connections to the 2021 storming of the U.S. Capitol were reported. Epik has also provided hosting and registrar services to Patriots.win, formerly TheDonald.win, an independent far-right forum that has served as the successor for the r/The_Donald subreddit that was banned in June 2020.

In September and October 2021, hackers identifying themselves as a part of Anonymous released several caches of data obtained from Epik in a large-scale data breach.

In 2023, Epik's registrar and hosting platform were sold to Epik, LLC, a new subsidiary of Registered Agents Inc, after the company reportedly experienced financial hardship due to litigation surrounding Monster's alleged mishandling of funds. Following the sale, Epik's new owner made efforts to rebrand as a registrar for business owners, updating its terms of service and removing its controversial customers including Kiwi Farms and Gab.

== History ==
Epik was founded in Washington in 2009 by Rob Monster, who served as the company's chief executive officer (CEO). Epik is primarily known for its domain name registration services, and described itself as the "Swiss bank of the domain industry". As of January 2022, Epik was the 22nd largest domain registrar in the United States and 47th largest globally, as measured by the number of domains registered through the company.

=== Expansion of services ===
Until 2018, Epik primarily focused on domain trading and mostly stayed out of the public spotlight. Following a series of acquisitions in 2019, Epik also began providing an increasing variety of other web services including web hosting, content delivery network (CDN) services, and DDoS protection.

=== Leadership changes and new ownership ===
In September 2022, Monster stepped down as CEO and installed Brian Royce as his successor. After repaying debts to avoid litigation, and amid allegations of financial misconduct by Monster, on June 8, 2023, Epik.com and its associated domain registrar platform were sold to Epik LLC for $5 million. Epik LLC is owned by Registered Agents Inc., a registered agent company founded by Dan Keen. Registered agents act as official points of contact for companies, allowing business owners to maintain privacy. The sale was finalized in January 2024 after ICANN approved the transfer. Domain Incite confirmed after the transfer that neither Monster, Royce, nor any other members of leadership or shareholders, were involved in the new entity, contrary to speculation. Epik made changes to its terms of service during the ICANN review that saw the company remove violators and “problematic clients” from its platform.

Representatives from Registered Agents Inc. made efforts to distance the new Epik from its previous reputation in statements to Domain Incite and TechRadar stating the registrar would focus on entrepreneurs and small business owners. According to Christopher Ambler, a former principal GoDaddy software architect who joined RAI in 2022, Epik is no longer "the right-wing registrar".

== Governance ==
Epik board members have included Braden Pollock and Tal Moore. Rob Davis served as senior vice president for strategy and communications. Moore left the board in December 2018, over the company's choice to host Gab. Peterson left the company in 2019, and said that he left shortly after Monster began a company staff meeting by asking employees to watch the video of the Christchurch mosque shootings, which he said would prove to them that the attack had been faked. Pollock had also resigned by the summer of 2020, citing ideological differences.

== Acquisitions ==
In February 2019, it was announced that Epik had acquired BitMitigate, an American cybersecurity company based in Vancouver, Washington. BitMitigate protects websites against potential threats including distributed denial-of-service (DDoS) attacks. The company continues to operate as a division of Epik, and BitMitigate's founder Nicholas Lim briefly served as Epik's chief technology officer.

Epik acquired web hosting company Sibyl Systems Ltd. in 2019. Sibyl was originally incorporated in the Seychelles in 2017 and later in England in 2018. Sibyl was known for hosting Gab after the platform was terminated by its previous host. In February 2019, the SPLC described Sibyl as a "shadowy operation with little transparency on its website, a murky history of ownership and no fixed base of operations".

== Termination of services ==
When Epik began providing services to 8chan in August 2019, after the imageboard was taken offline by its host when it was discovered that the perpetrator of the 2019 El Paso shooting allegedly posted his manifesto on the site, several service providers stopped providing services to Epik. In August 2019, web services company Voxility banned Epik after determining it was hosting 8chan.

That same week, Amazon said it was "trying to find out whether any Amazon Web Services infrastructure is indirectly supporting 8chan through Epik", as 8chan's content violated Amazon's Acceptable Use Policy. Epik reported it would no longer provide web hosting services for 8chan due to "the concern of inadequate enforcement and the elevated possibility of violent radicalization on the platform". On August 9, cloud hosting provider Linode informed Epik they would be terminating services to the company.

In October 2020, financial services provider PayPal terminated service for Epik due to financial risk concerns. The company did not define the risks, but Mashable alleged that PayPal's concerns were related to Epik's alternative currency, Masterbucks, and that PayPal terminated service because Epik allegedly had not taken the proper legal steps to offer it. Mashable also reported that the termination was partly due to concerns by PayPal that the site was encouraging tax evasion by advertising the "tax advantages" of using Masterbucks. Epik accused PayPal of terminating service because they were biased against conservatives.

== Data breach ==
On September 13, 2021, hackers identifying as part of the Anonymous hacktivist group announced they had obtained access to what they called "a decade's worth" of personal data, including all domains ever registered or hosted with the company, account credentials, including approximately 15 million email addresses scraped from WHOIS records, employee emails and unidentified private keys. The 180 gigabytes of data was curated by the Distributed Denial of Secrets group, Journalists and security researchers subsequently confirmed the veracity of the hack and the types of data that had been exposed.

Epik initially denied knowledge of the breach (one engineer described them as being "fully compromised end-to-end ... maybe the worst I've ever seen in my 20-year career" to The Daily Dot), leading to the attackers vandalizing Epik's support website. On September 15, the company sent an email notifying customers of an incident, which was confirmed as a hack by Rob Monster via a public video conference the next day, which Le Monde characterized as "possibly one of the strangest responses to a computer security incident in history". The company confirmed the breach the following day, and on the 19th, began informing customers.

Anonymous would later release additional data on September 29 and October 4, 2021, including 300 gigabytes of bootable disk images and API keys for third-party services used by Epik, and disk images and data belonging to the Republican Party of Texas. The defacement of the party's website in September 2021 was later attributed to the breach, according to Cyberscoop.

== Notable clients ==
Epik is known for providing services to websites with far-right content, such as the social network Gab, video hosting service BitChute, and conspiracy theory website InfoWars. It was described in 2019 by Vice as "a safehaven for the extreme right" and in 2021 by The Seattle Times as "a home for far-right websites" because of its willingness to host far-right websites that have been denied service by other Internet service providers. In 2021, The Daily Telegraph wrote that Epik was "a safe harbour for websites said to be enabling the spread far-right extremism and carrying Neo-Nazi content"; the same year, Fortune called the company the "right wing's best friend online". NPR reported in February 2021 that "when websites flooded with hate speech or harmful disinformation become too radioactive for the Internet, the sites often turn to [Epik] for a lifeline."

Epik has also provided services for websites, platforms, and groups including Parler, 8chan, Patriots.win, The Daily Stormer, One America News Network, AR15.com, Kiwi Farms, the Proud Boys, and the Oath Keepers. (Note: Epik has provided services for: Parler; 8chan; Gab; BitChute; Patriots.win; The Daily Stormer; InfoWars; One America News Network; AR15.com; Kiwi Farms; Proud Boys; Oath Keepers)

Epik describes itself as a protector of free speech, and its past CEO Rob Monster defended its decisions to host extremist content as being a part of Epik's commitment to "welcome all views, without bias or preference". Monster had said he was repudiating "cancel culture" and Big Tech. In February 2021, Michael Edison Hayden of the SPLC said that although hate speech can be found throughout the internet, including on mainstream social networks like Facebook and Twitter, "The difference is there are people with terroristic ambitions plotting out in the open, producing propaganda that they seek to use to kind of encourage violence. And those are the kind of websites Rob Monster is willing to pick up."

In September 2025, following the murder of right-wing podcaster Charlie Kirk, Epik LLC confirmed it took down a doxing site that published personal information of people who allegedly celebrated the commentator's death. In a statement to Salon, Epik said the domain was registered using false information and resulted in threats of DDoS attacks that were "directly connected to the website's activities", and that they focus on providing services to "legitimate business owners".

On March 6, 2026, Epik permanently suspended two domains associated with the text forum 5channel due to content related to animal cruelty that violated Epik's terms of service. They will not be eligible for transfer, according to the sites' owner, Jim Watkins. Watkins took to social media to announce the suspension stating other domains under his control, including 8kun.net, were likely going to be affected. According to an email from Epik that Watkins shared, on the site, all of Watkin's accounts were suspended, and the remaining domains were to be transferred away from Epik by March 9 due to failure to moderate content.

=== Parler ===
In January 2021, the alt-tech social network Parler transferred its domain name registration to Epik, following the termination of its hosting and support services by other providers on account of it being "overrun" with death threats and celebrations of violence. According to Fortune, Epik provided Parler with advice on running the service, including adding moderators, improving systems to detect harmful posts, and changing their terms of service.

=== 8chan ===
On August 5, 2019, Epik competitor Cloudflare announced that in the wake of the 2019 El Paso shooting they would no longer be providing services to 8chan, a far-right imageboard known as a location for hateful content and child sexual abuse material, which the perpetrator of the shooting had allegedly used immediately prior to the attack to post a manifesto justifying his actions. The same day that 8chan was removed from Cloudflare, Epik began providing hosting services, and Monster released a statement explaining their decision. Later that day, Epik's primary hardware and connectivity provider Voxility banned Epik from renting their server space. Voxility's vice president of business development stated, "We have made the connection that at least two or three of the latest mass shootings in the U.S. were connected with [Epik and BitMitigate]. At some point, somebody needed to make the decision on where the limit is between what is illegal and what is freedom of speech and today it had to be us." The Voxility ban took 8chan offline, along with The Daily Stormer and other Epik customers. On August 6, Epik reversed course and announced that they would not provide hosting services to 8chan; on August 7, Ars Technica noted that Epik had only ceased hosting their content and was still providing 8chan with DNS services. Later that October, 8chan was renamed "8kun" and registered at a different domain registrar, Tucows. In November, the site was removed from Tucows two days after it went back online.

=== Gab ===
Epik received media attention in early November 2018 for registering Gab, an American alt-tech social networking service known for its far-right userbase, after it was ousted by GoDaddy for allowing "content on the site that both promotes and encourages violence against people". This came shortly after it was revealed that the perpetrator of the Pittsburgh synagogue shooting had used the service to post "hateful content". Tal Moore, a member of Epik's board, resigned in December 2018 over the company's involvement with Gab. On November 7, 2018, Pennsylvania Attorney General Josh Shapiro sent a subpoena to Epik requesting "any and all documents which are related in any way to Gab" after Gab registered its domains onto Epik. Gab posted screenshots of the subpoena letter in a tweet on the day the subpoena was sent, despite being asked to keep the letter confidential. The tweet was deleted hours later. In an email statement to Ars Technica, Monster stated that "the news of the subpoena was not intended for public consumption" and that "we are cooperating with their inquiry".

Gab was among the customers removed from the registrar after Registered Agents Inc.'s acquisition of Epik.

=== Patriots.win ===
Epik provides hosting to Patriots.win, previously known as TheDonald.win, the independent far-right web forum that was created as a successor to the r/The_Donald subreddit banned by Reddit in June 2020. The website has been labeled "a magnet for extreme discourse" by the Financial Times.

According to a report in the Wall Street Journal on January 16, 2021, Epik had threatened to take TheDonald.win offline over the forum failing to remove white supremacist, racist, and violent content. The Journal also reported that Jody Williams, TheDonald.win's owner, had received multiple requests from the FBI for user information due to threatening posts. Williams had struggled to moderate the forum's racist, antisemitic, and violent posts over the prior months, and some of TheDonald.win's volunteer moderators had responded by thwarting Williams's efforts to take down the violent and objectionable content on the forum. Williams and his family had also received daily death threats from the users he banned from the forum. On January 20, 2021, due to an internal power struggle over the TheDonald.win domain between the moderators and Williams, a new forum called Patriots.win was created and TheDonald.win was shut down by Williams on January 21.

=== The Daily Stormer ===
In August 2019, when Epik discovered newly acquired cybersecurity company BitMitigate was hosting an American neo-Nazi, white supremacist, and antisemitic commentary and message board website, The Daily Stormer, Epik stopped providing services. BitMitigate had been hosting the site since GoDaddy and Cloudflare terminated services after mocking the death of Heather Heyer at the 2017 Charlottesville car attack.

In a 2021 interview with NPR, Monster said that Epik's connection to The Daily Stormer was "regrettable", and that "The greatest cost of acquiring BitMitigate was not the amount of cash that we paid to buy the technology, but the entanglement."

=== Kiwi Farms ===
After Cloudflare deplatformed the harassment forum Kiwi Farms in November 2022, Epik began providing the website with domain registration services. In January 2024, the new Epik LLC discontinued its registration agreement with Kiwi Farms, citing complaints about child sexual abuse material, doxing, and other terms of service violations. Epik claimed on Twitter that it had suspended services to the website after receiving a United States court order, and alleged that the website had been hosting child sexual abuse material. Kiwi Farms responded by threatening Epik with a defamation lawsuit.

== LegitScript ==
Wired wrote in 2018 that Epik had a history of not responding to reports of illegal activity on the websites they registered, which the magazine noted as unusual for domain registrars based in the United States. Pharmaceutical watchdog website LegitScript had reported in 2018 that they alerted Epik to the sale of illegal drugs and counterfeit medications on websites registered by Epik, and that Epik had declined to act upon the information without a court order. Epik's CEO at the time, Rob Monster, responded to LegitScript by pointing out that they do take action on domains when court orders are presented, that they could not reasonably assess all claims of illegality themselves, and that they could not merely take LegitScript's claim that something was illegal as the organization represents corporate pharmacy interests.

== Logos ==
2009–2023

2023–2024

2024–present

== See also ==
- DDoS-Guard
