= Nicholas Lim =

Nicholas Lim may refer to:

- Nicholas Lim (entrepreneur) (born 1997 or 1998), technology entrepreneur
- Nicholas Lim (swimmer) (born 2001), Hong Kong swimmer
