= Registered Agents Inc. =

US-based registered agent company

- Founded: 2008; 18 years ago
- Founder: Dan Keen
- Headquarters: Sheridan, Wyoming, United States
- Services: Registered agent
- Subsidiaries: Epik; Two Barrels LLC; Corporate Tools LLC
- Website: www.registeredagentsinc.com

Registered Agents Inc. (RAI) is a Wyoming-based national registered agent firm founded in 2008. The company provides business formation services to set up limited liability companies (LLCs) and corporations and acts as a point of contact for legal notices. The company is headquartered in Sheridan, Wyoming.

As a registered agent, RAI lists its address on client formation documents, obscuring ownership. In some reported instances, employees have used pseudonyms on clients' business formation documents, a practice the company has denied.

In 2023, the company acquired Epik, a domain registrar and web hosting company known for providing services to the alt-right, in order to provide those services to its business clients.

As of 2026, RAI is reportedly the largest business formation service provider in the United States.

== History ==
In 2008, Dan Keen founded RAI after running a tree trimming and landscaping business. Initially focusing on company incorporation in the Pacific Northwest, Dan Keen grew RAI into a registered agent incorporating companies throughout the United States. According to Wired, RAI is a "one-stop shop for people seeking to incorporate a business in any US state, often in those with advantageous tax policies, while obscuring their identities." Wired also reported that RAI uses pseudonyms to mask the identities of its employees and to sign its customers' incorporation documents. In response, RAI called the reporting "outdated and patently wrong". In August 2021, RAI served as the registered agent for over 50,000 companies in Wyoming alone. In 2026, Fortune reported that RAI is the largest provider of business formation services in the U.S. and releases a monthly business formation report that shows state-level filing data from all U.S. states and Washington D.C.

In 2020, RAI threatened to sue a Wyoming newspaper, The Sheridan Press, after it reported RAI to be the registered agent of companies with no presence in Wyoming that had received CARES Act money during the COVID-19 pandemic. In 2022, a joint investigation by The Washington Post and the International Consortium of Investigative Journalists stated that registered agents with apparent ties to RAI represented companies accused by Brazilian officials of laundering COVID-19 funds. The Alo Group, which received $531,562 in Paycheck Protection Program funds (PPP), later switched its mailing address from RAI's to an address in China before being administratively dissolved for not filing state paperwork in 2022.

In 2023, the Committee to Protect Journalists reported that a company incorporated with RAI was used in cyberattacks against media organizations in several countries. The same year, according to Reuters, RAI served as the registered agent for LLCs used in cyberattacks, including one linked to a Russian entrepreneur and another used in an attack targeting Somali journalists. RAI was one of two firms that registered 55 percent of all incorporations in Wyoming in 2023, the year that Wyoming surpassed Delaware as the U.S. state with the most incorporations.

In May 2024, Wyoming Secretary of State Chuck Gray dissolved three companies registered by RAI that the Federal Bureau of Investigation (FBI) found to be linked to fraud directed by North Korea's Ministry of Defence.

== Subsidiaries ==
In June 2023, RAI acquired Epik, a domain name registrar and web hosting service that had traditionally catered to far-right and extremist hate group websites that had been denied service by other internet service providers. For ICANN accreditation in 2023, there was an update to the terms of service and "problematic" clients were removed, including controversial customers such as Kiwi Farms and Gab. Focus was shifted to RAI's business clients.

RAI also owns a software development company called Two Barrels LLC and a company that helps manage multiple corporation filings called Corporate Tools LLC.

== See also ==
- Shell corporation
- Shelf corporation
- Beneficial ownership
- Wyoming as a corporate haven
