= Near (programmer) =

American Programmer (1983–2021)

- Near, c. 2019
- Born: February 22, 1983
- Died: June 27, 2021 (aged 38); Arakawa, Tokyo, Japan
- Cause of death: Suicide by hanging
- Other names: David Kirk Ginder, Byuu
- Occupation: Programmer
- Years active: 2004–2021
- Known for: Video game console emulator development
- Notable work: Higan
- Website: near.sh (Archived)

David Kirk Ginder (February 22, 1983 – June 27, 2021), better known by the pseudonyms Near and Byuu, was an American programmer who specialized in emulation of video game console hardware. They developed higan, the first emulator to reach 100% compatibility with the Super Nintendo library. Near also contributed to fan translations and SNES preservation efforts.

== Biography ==
Near started out in the emulation scene as an amateur programmer, translating Japanese video game ROM images at the age of 14, and one year later developed a tool for displaying resized text font in games. After that, a patching assembler called "xkas" would follow, which streamlined the ROM-translation process. The development of bsnes, later known as higan, was triggered by bugs during translation of Super Famicom game Der Langrisser that would only appear on the original hardware but not on 2004-era Super NES emulators; as such, the aim of bsnes was for accurate emulation.

Near contributed to the translation of the Nintendo RPG Mother 3 and to the improvement of the emulator Snes9x. They also engaged extensively in creating faithful copies of Super NES games for preservation. They also invented the "MSU-1" mapper, which gave the Super NES 4 gigabytes of ROM space and the ability to play CD-quality audio. In 2019, Near retreated from the emulation scene, after "a series of escalating privacy intrusions and targeted Internet harassment" affected their mental health. In February 2021, Near released a new translation for the Super Famicom game Bahamut Lagoon, a passion project that they had attempted multiple times since 1998. This is also the game where Near's former pseudonym of byuu comes from.

== Death ==
In a Twitter thread posted on June 27, 2021, Near stated that they were the victim of long-term harassment from Kiwi Farms users. Near, who was non-binary, said that they had endured lifelong bullying but that the abuse had recently centralized around Kiwi Farms, which had "made the harassment orders of magnitude worse". Near stated that they and their friends had been doxed and goaded into suicide by members of the website, and that Near had been mocked for being autistic. After posting online, Near hanged themself around 1 pm local time; an autopsy revealed anti-depressants and cold medication in Near's system at the time of death. Tokyo police entered Near's apartment and found their body the next day, following numerous wellness check requests to the police and United States Embassy.

On June 28, Hector Martin posted a link to a Google Doc which he said came from a mutual friend of his and Near's, which said that Near had died by suicide, and alleged that the harassment from Kiwi Farms amounted to murder. Martin subsequently reported on June 28 that he had spoken to police who confirmed that Near had died the previous day. USA Today reported on July 23, 2021, that it had confirmed with Near's former employer that they had died.
