= MangaDex =

Manga aggregation website

- Logo and wordmark

- A screenshot of MangaDex's website
- Website type: Content aggregation
- Available in: Interface available in English, Spanish, French, and Brazilian Portuguese; user uploads in several other languages
- Founded: January 2018
- Founder: Hologfx
- Website: mangadex.org
- Commercial: No
- Registration: Optional
- Launched: January 10, 2018; 8 years ago
- Current status: Active

MangaDex is a not-for-profit website that aggregates translations of manga, manhwa, and manhua. Content on the website is usually unofficial, uploaded by "scanlation" groups, but links to official services like Manga Plus and Bilibili Comics are also provided on the website. MangaDex was started in 2018 by developer Hologfx, and is funded through user donations and affiliate programs. The website is blocked in several countries, including Italy, Russia, and Indonesia.

== Content ==
MangaDex primarily hosts unofficial fan translations (scanlations) of manga, manhwa, and manhua uploaded by users, with content on the website often being liable for copyright takedowns. Outgoing links to chapters from official services like Manga Plus and Bilibili Comics are also available, however. MangaDex provides advanced search filtering for series based on demographic (e.g. Shōjo, Shōnen), themes, genres, format and publication status, and allows users to organize titles into personalized libraries. A forum is also hosted on the website. Funding for the website's servers is provided through user donations and affiliate programs. It is run by unpaid volunteers. (Note: "About Us". MangaDex.) The interface of the website is available in English, Spanish, French, and Brazilian Portuguese, with chapters also being available in other languages. (Note: See dropdown menus in the language section of the settings page: "User Settings". MangaDex. Archived from the original on May 28, 2023.)

== History ==
MangaDex was created by developer Hologfx in January 2018 as part of "Project AniDex". An official forum for the website was made public in March.

=== DMCA subpoena ===
On December 20, 2019, attorney Evan Stone requested a subpoena on behalf of Viz Media against Cloudflare to give up identifying information on MangaDex's operator. Stone alleged that the website was infringing the copyright of Viz Media by hosting the manga Boruto: Naruto Next Generations. The subpoena was filed in the United States District Court for the Northern District of Texas. On January 1, 2020, MangaDex announced on Twitter that they had shut the site down, and would be moving their content to a new web hosting service. They expected to be down for approximately 72 hours. Writing for Everyeye.it, Amedeo Sebastiano speculated that the intention of Viz Media, who are owned by Shueisha, may have been to eliminate competition to their new platform Manga Plus. Shueisha had previously requested a subpoena of manga-hosting website Mangastream in March, and sued another website, Hoshinoromi, in September.

The website was back up on January 5 under another hosting service with a different temporary top-level domain, .cc; they had previously used .org. The DMCA subpoena was allegedly caused by a user uploading colored edits of official English translations of Boruto, which was prohibited on the website. Due to legal issues, the new host would not accept site donations, leaving funding for the site an issue. The offending chapters were removed, and the website asked users not to upload official released chapters. They also urged users to report any violations.

=== 2020 bandwidth issues and MangaDex@Home ===
In 2020, MangaDex started experiencing bandwidth issues from increased traffic during the COVID-19 lockdowns, compounded by manga-pirating website MangaRock shutting down. Both events led to 15 percent increases in traffic. The operators of the website were also informed that one of its providers would no longer host cached images on their servers. They consequently described "dismal loading times for old chapters", and announced in June that they would launch MangaDex@Home, an open-source, peer-to-peer, distributed computing project that would allow users to volunteer their PCs or servers to host cached images, alleviating bandwidth costs. They described the user participation to be "greater than [they] could have imagined", and all visitors of the website were set to receive images from other users through MangaDex@Home rather than MangaDex's servers. Requirements for hosting on the service were described by PC Professionale writer Alfonso Maruccia as stringent, asking users to have at least 80 megabytes per second of both upload and download speed, 40 gigabytes of dedicated space, and 24/7 upkeep. In August, MangaDex reported that their servers were under heavy strain due to new registrations after the websites KissAnime and KissManga were shut down.

=== Data breach and codebase rewrite ===
On March 17, 2021, MangaDex operators stated that a hacker had gained access to an administrator's account through a session token from an old database leak. The developers found the vulnerabilities that caused this, but three days later, the hacker gained additional access to another administrator account. They claimed to have gained access to user data, and sent a ransom notice to the developers for $10 thousand in bitcoin. Two hours later, they posted a source code leak to GitHub, where they claimed that the site still had a vulnerability despite earlier patches from the developers. The site's operators had no evidence that there had been a data breach, but they still assumed that it had happened for security reasons, and shut down the website in addition to warning users to reset their password. The hacker's source code leak was removed from GitHub following a takedown notice by MangaDex later that month. Following the attack, MangaDex announced a bug bounty program to further improve security.

By mid-April, MangaDex had confirmed that they had identified a data breach containing users' email addresses, IP addresses, and hashed passwords. They consequently worked with security website Have I Been Pwned? to inform users of the breach, and encouraged people to change their passwords. By this point, the leak had been circulating privately on the internet, but not widely so according to Have I Been Pwned? operator Troy Hunt.

After the hack, the developers stated that the website's codebase would be completely rewritten for a more secure v5 version of the website, which they estimated would take between one and three weeks. They also stated that it was difficult to give an accurate estimate of the downtime because of the site being run by volunteers. The API of the v5 codebase rewrite was released into closed beta on April 12, with an open release on May 11. On June 6, the frontend for the rework was released into early access.

=== Blocks ===
In June 2021, customers of the internet service provider (ISP) Verizon started reporting that they had become unable to access MangaDex and other websites hosted by DDoS-Guard. TorrentFreak journalist Ernesto van der Sar speculated that the block may not have been on purpose, but rather collateral damage of Verizon blocking IP addresses that are similar to MangaDex's. In November, MangaDex's developers managed to create a work-around to allow Verizon customers to access the website, but they were uncertain if it would work permanently. They suggested that users should "consider switching to an ISP that doesn't censor [their] internet access". They did not provide an explanation to the workaround. Similarly, Indonesian ISPs owned by Telkom Indonesia, including IndiHome and Telkomsel, blocked users from accessing the website in November 2021. A MangaDex administrator claimed on their official Discord server that Telkom had been extorting them for money, alleging that Telkom customers would not be able to access the website unless MangaDex paid them.

On December 23, 2021, the Italian government agency Autorità per le Garanzie nelle Comunicazioni stopped MangaDex from operating in Italy after a complaint from the Italian Publishers' Association. This also affected other websites hosting manga. In August 2022, users in Russia similarly lost access to the website. (Note: BraveDude8_1 (August 31, 2022). "MangaDex has been blocked in Russia, please read this post for ways to avoid the block". Reddit. Archived from the original on November 30, 2022.)

=== 2025 DMCA takedown ===
In May 2025, approximately 7,000 series were removed from MangaDex after a coordinated DMCA takedown request from Japanese and Korean publishers, including Kodansha, Square Enix and Naver. According to a moderator, it is the largest takedown in the website's history.

== See also ==
- Bato (website) – Chinese file hosting website
- Mangamura – Japanese manga piracy website
- Online piracy – Illegal use of digital copyrighted works
- Scanlation – Fan translation of comics, often manga
