= Wyoming as a corporate haven =

State of Wyoming Flag

The US state of Wyoming is known for having a business-formation climate suitable for those seeking to maintain privacy in business operations. The state's business and trust formation laws have been given the moniker the "cowboy cocktail" by wealth managers.

Wyoming does not require ownership information to be listed on Limited Liability Company (LLC) filings paperwork. Instead, out-of-state business owners are required to hire a registered agent within the state whose address would be listed on paperwork in their place. Unlike most states, Wyoming allows trusts, which are used to protect assets, to be controlled by a private company, including LLCs. Wyoming has quickly become one of the leading states for new LLC filings.

These laws have been the subject of criticism by journalists and local officials for their appeal to foreign adversaries, oligarchs, and those looking to commit fraud. Entities registered in Wyoming have been subject to investigations into illegal activities such as scams, hacking, and money laundering. Incidents of fraud and abuse have been the subject of investigations by the FBI, as well as by journalists at the Washington Post and the International Consortium of Investigative Journalists (ICIJ).

In 2023, the secretary of state's office reported having processed 590,000 business filings within that fiscal year. State and Federal legislatures have passed laws in order to make the formation of fraudulent companies more difficult. In 2021, the Corporate Transparency Act was passed by Congress in an effort to require small businesses to disclose beneficial ownership information.

In Wyoming, a bill that enables the state to more easily dissolve companies formed by foreign adversaries was signed into law on February 24, 2025. Additional bills have been introduced to limit shell companies and dissolve companies that give false information on state formation documents. None of the bills introduced to the state legislatures have included language that requires the disclosure of business-owner information as of March 2025. Supporters of Wyoming's current laws have argued that increased regulation could cause law-abiding businesses to look to form elsewhere, or that innocent business owners may be harassed based on partisanship.

== Background ==
=== LLCs ===
Wyoming was the first U.S. state to enable the formation of Limited Liability Companies (LLCs) in 1977. The Internal Revenue Service (IRS) disputed the formation until 1988, when they agreed to allow LLCs to determine how they are taxed, either as a corporation or a partnership. The business formation category was eventually adopted by all US states. LLCs give the limited liability of owners similar to that of a corporation, as well as the lower tax obligations of a limited partnership. The US Treasury Department has stated that LLCs are uniquely vulnerable to being used as shell companies due to the protections offered to business owners.

In 2009, the state discovered 5,700 companies registered using post office boxes. The laws were changed soon after to require registered agents to have a physical presence in the state. In 2010, Wyoming enacted the Wyoming Limited Liability Company Act, which brought enhanced privacy protections for LLC members and managers. This new legislation replaced the Original LLC Act with provisions allowing increased flexibility in operating agreements and increased privacy regarding member and manager information.

=== Trusts ===
Wyoming's trust-formation laws have made the state a leading jurisdiction for establishing trusts, as they emphasize asset protection and a high degree of privacy, allowing for the shielding of assets. The state was ranked in the top 10 least-restrictive trust jurisdictions in the world, according to a study conducted in 2020 by Adam Hofri-Winogradow at the Hebrew University of Jerusalem.

Wyoming adopted the Uniform Trust Code (UTC) in 2003, which updated the state's trust laws and intended to offer clear guidance in the event of legal inquiries. The Economically Needed Diversity Options for Wyoming (ENDOW) Executive Council was created in 2017. The council released a 20-Year Economic Diversification Strategy in 2018 to highlight the importance of financial infrastructure development to support new developing industries.

In Wyoming, trustees have ways to adapt to beneficiaries' changing needs, such as decanting, where trustees can adjust trust terms without relying on the original trust document. Wyoming's decanting law is broad, giving trustees flexibility to distribute trust assets to benefit beneficiaries based on the trust's terms. This law is unique in allowing trustees with limited powers to make changes.

Wyoming was the first state to establish digital assets, like cryptocurrency and NFTs, as intangible property under Article 9 of the Uniform Commercial Code (UCC), putting them under the same protections as other assets.

In Wyoming, a trust can be controlled by an LLC rather than a named person, otherwise known as a private trust company. Wyoming also allows unregulated private trust companies, which are not subject to state supervision and oversight.

Wyoming is one of only a handful of states that allow silent trusts, where the existence of the trust is kept secret until a later date, such as when a beneficiary reaches a certain age. It is also one of few states that allows for self-settled asset protection trusts, which are often favored when the settlor or beneficiary wants to receive distributions and act as an investment advisor.

Similar to Florida and Texas, Wyoming has no individual or corporate state income tax. It also has no capital gains tax, no gift tax, and no estate tax, giving it one of the lowest overall tax burdens in the U.S. Wyoming's trusts are taxed the same as other business entities in the state. When a trust is set up as an LLC, profit distributes to LLC members and is taxed as any other LLC.

=== Registered Agents ===
A registered agent acts as a contact entity on behalf of the companies it represents and is legally required when forming an LLC or corporation. A registered agent with a physical address within the state must be included on formation documents for out-of-state businesses so that the business owners can be contacted in the event of a lawsuit.

A registered agent becomes a commercial registered agent once it represents more than 10 businesses within the state. As of 2020, there were an estimated 450 commercial registered agents operating within the state of Wyoming. Commercial registered agents are required to keep the names and addresses of LLC managers, members, or directors. The registered agent gets listed on formation documents, allowing the identity of the LLCs owner to be kept private.

These agents also often provide general corporate services, such as filing incorporation documents and annual reports. Most often, registered agents have no further information or knowledge into the companies' operations.

=== Cowboy Cocktail ===
The combination of Wyoming's low tax burdens, and the layering of LLCs and trusts to obscure the identities of business owners and trustees, is referred to as the "Cowboy Cocktail". Compared to other states with similar protections like Alaska and Texas, Wyoming's business registration rate is growing at a much faster rate than its population. According to Allison Tait, a law professor at University of Richmond, "Wyoming is advertising itself as the new onshore-offshore." As of 2021, Wyoming's trust companies managed approximately $31.5 billion in assets, according to ICIJ.

In 2015, Wyoming had approximately 128,000 businesses active in the state. In 2023, the Secretary of State's office reported having processed 590,000 business filings within that fiscal year alone. Wyoming had 378 new businesses incorporated per 1,000 adults compared to the national average of 36 per 1,000 adults. That same year, Wyoming became the top state for new business registrations, surpassing Delaware.

According to Business Insider, Wyoming's business growth indicates that the business sector is beginning to migrate to the West, seeking out more affordable options for their business ventures. The state of Montana has seen similar growth to Wyoming in recent years, and both joined Delaware as having the most new businesses start up per-capita during the first half of 2024. Combining their own research and Census Bureau data, Business Insider reported that, as of June 2024, Wyoming saw 289 new businesses per 100,000 people since the beginning of the year, compared to Delaware which had 153, and Montana, 106.

For fiscal year 2023, Wyoming received approximately $42 million in revenue from filing fees, an increase of approximately 25% from the year prior, according to SVI News and local media outlet the Cowboy State Daily. The majority of businesses being created were LLCs, the subsequent majority of which have under $300,000 in assets within the state.

== Reported misuses and inquiries ==
=== 2010s ===
In 2011, Reuters reported on a property in Cheyenne that it dubbed "a little Cayman Island on the Great Plains." The property, located at 2710 Thomas Avenue, was Wyoming Corporate Services, a business-formation firm used to register alleged shell companies. Included in the businesses formed using the address was a shell company shielding real-estate assets belonging to an imprisoned former prime minister of Ukraine.

In 2016, Igor Makarov, a Russian billionaire, formed a trust in Wyoming which in turn held three companies that were registered in the British Virgin Islands. One owned a private jet according to reporting by ICIJ. Following the 2022 invasion of Ukraine, Marakov was sanctioned by several countries, excluding the United States. The existence of the trust was revealed in a leak of financial records known as the Pandora Papers.

=== 2020 ===
During the COVID-19 shutdowns of 2020, a Wyoming-registered firm called the Alo Group received $531,562 in payroll support through the Paycheck Protection Program (PPP) for 36 US-based employees the firmed claimed to have. No public profile for the company was found. The company had registered through Registered Agents Inc, based out of Sheridan, Wyoming. After relief funds were distributed, Alo Group changed their registered address to one in China then later dissolved after failing to file state paperwork.

=== 2022 ===
In March 2022, The Washington Post and ICIJ launched an investigation into activities related to registered agents and businesses registered in Wyoming. They found a single registered agent operating out of their home had serviced approximately 350 companies, including some with ties to individuals such as a Ukrainian businessman alleged to have stolen billions from a bank in Ukraine, a former lawyer convicted of "pimping" through a massage parlor in California, and someone who served time in New York for investment fraud.

In May 2022, St. Luke's Health System in Idaho filed a defamation lawsuit against Ammon Bundy and one of his associates, alleging they spread misinformation online for personal gain. Ammon Bundy is mostly known for his involvement in the 2016 occupation of the Malheur National Wildlife Refuge in Oregon. St. Luke's attorney claimed that Bundy set up shell corporations in Wyoming and transferred assets into them to potentially avoid paying damages. Someone associated with Bundy's gubernatorial campaign established Wyoming LLCs, including White Barn Enterprises LLC, Farmhouse Holdings LLC, and Potters Construction FHB LLC, on July 20, 2022. St. Luke's raised concerns about asset transfers to these Wyoming LLCs, citing potential fraudulent conveyances.

=== 2023 ===
In August 2023, the Somali Journalists Syndicate's website and email accounts were knocked offline by a distributed denial-of-service (DDoS) attack. The attack coincided with the abduction of a reporter associated with the group. With the help of Qurium, a Sweden-based non-profit group that provides digital defense, the cyber attack was traced back to an LLC based in Wyoming. Speaking with Reuters, Qurium's technical director, Tord Lundstom, stated that hackers were drawn to Wyoming LLCs because they could appear to originate from within the U.S. and Wyoming's formations "were advertised as cost effective and user friendly."

Reuters also reported that in September 2023, a similar DDoS operation took the website for the International Press Institute, which is based in Vienna, offline. It took approximately 10 days to fully restore the website. Qurium stepped in again and traced some of the data used in the attack to a separate Wyoming LLC, HostCram, which operates as a web-hosting company. The host company's operator claimed to terminate a client following the incident.

=== 2024 ===
In January, 2024, Cowboy State Daily reported that Vital Records LLC had registered in Wyoming with Registered Agents Inc in Sheridan. They provided copies of birth certificates obtained from the state to those inquiring for a price, much like the Department of Health does directly for a lower cost. They were later shut down after the Department of Health reported the firm to consumer-protection groups with the state.

Fremont County assessor Tara Berg stated in April 2024 that she had investigated several companies who appeared to use fake addresses in order to form businesses in her county. A 95-year-old resident had shown concern that his identity was being stolen. A Lander resident claimed their business address was being used without their permission. Addresses owned by the town of Shoshoni and Wyoming Catholic College were fraudulently used to form businesses. She named Republic Registered Agent LLC out of Casper as one LLC registration firm that commonly used fraudulent addresses.

In May 2024, the secretary of state, Chuck Gray, announced that he had dissolved three companies that had filed false information with the state. These entities, Culture Box LLC, Next Nets LLC, and Blackish Tech, LLC, were flagged by the FBI for suspected ties to North Korea. Culture Box had already been dissolved the previous December for not paying state dues. According to Cowboy State Daily, the FBI believed that the three companies had been involved in international money laundering. They had registered in 2022 and 2023, through Registered Agents Inc.

== Legislative responses ==
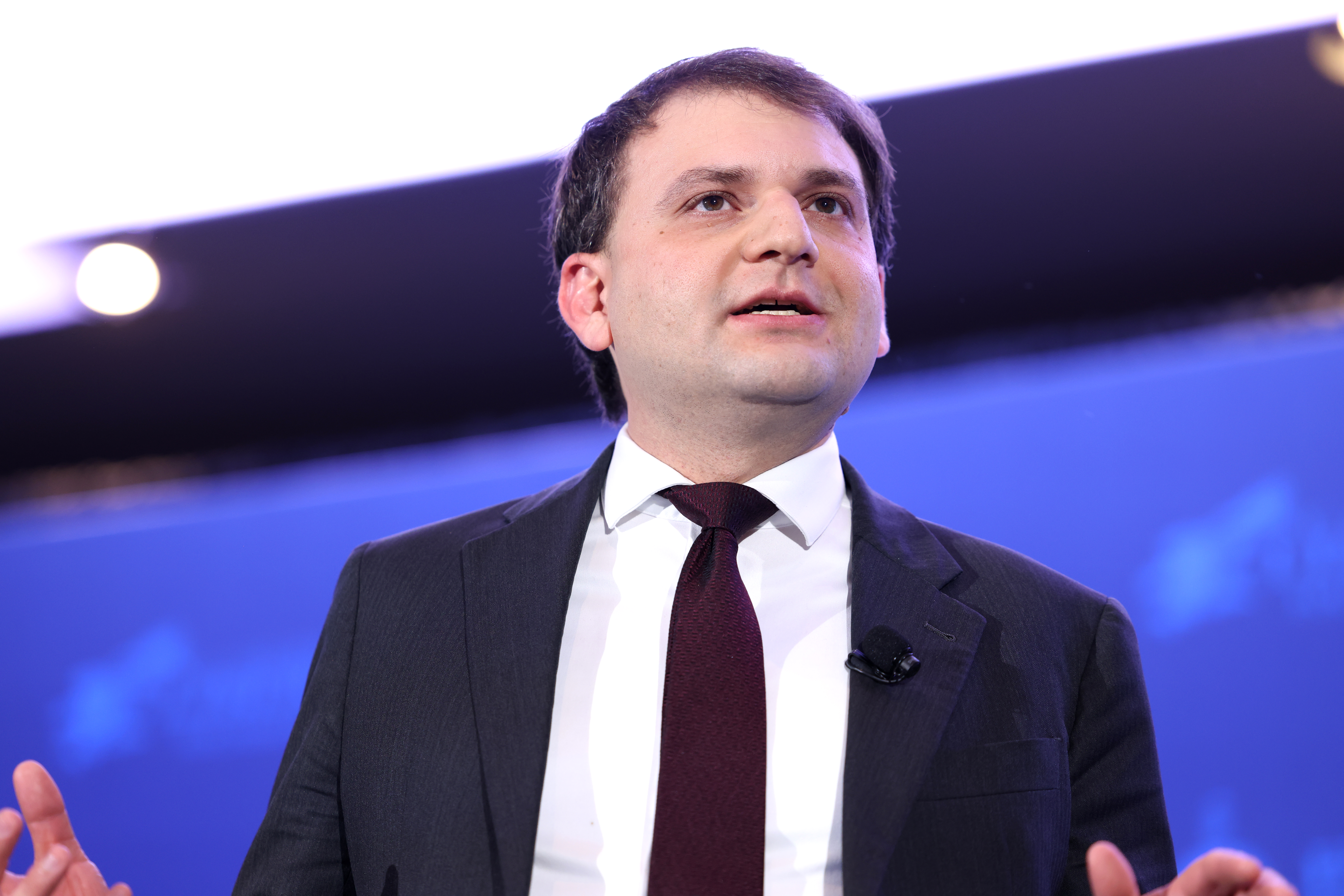
Chuck Gray, Wyoming's secretary of state in 2025

Historically, lawmakers in Wyoming have argued that the policies would bring an increase in jobs and revenue. In 2021, the Corporate Transparency Act was passed by Congress as part of the National Defense Authorization Act. The Act requires most businesses to report beneficial owner information and register with the U.S. Financial Crimes Enforcement Network, a bureau within the Department of Treasury. The bill was intended to limit the ability of bad actors to commit fraud or act with other nefarious purposes behind a veil of secrecy. However, in December 2024, a federal judge in Texas filed an injunction ruling the Act was an overstep by Congress, arguing business filings are handled at the state level. The government argued the law allowed enforcement agencies to locate shell companies that shielded criminal enterprises. On March 2, 2025, the Treasury Department announced it would pause enforcement or penalties against domestic companies, and make further adjustments later that would focus only on foreign reporting companies.

In 2022, a Republican-sponsored bill aimed at increasing transparency and regulation of trusts was rejected in the Wyoming statehouse after allegedly receiving push-backs from trust attorneys. Jackson attorney Chris Reimer argued in favor of Wyoming's current business structure, stating increased regulation would drive away "beneficial and law-abiding businesses to other states."

In 2023, Wyoming state legislators attempted to pass Senate File 93, which would have required LLCs owned by a trust to identify the trust and trustees. The bill failed to pass in committee by a narrow margin. State Senator Charles Scott, who was against the measure, argued during the debate that what is seen as "ill-gotten gains" may be determined on a partisan basis and that innocent business owners may become subject to harassment.

In 2024, a bill was proposed by state senator Barry Crago, a republican from Buffalo, that was similar to the Corporate Transparency Act. The bill would require businesses to report ownership information to registered agents, rather than federal agencies. As of November 2025, the bill has not been formally introduced.

On February 24, 2025, a bill streamlining the state's ability to dissolve companies controlled by "foreign adversaries" was signed into law, according to Secretary of State Chuck Gray. On February 28 the same year, Wyoming Governor Mark Gordon signed a similar law that states providing false information to registered agents when forming a business entity may result in dissolution by the Secretary of State. Gray confirmed in November 2025, the law had allowed them to dissolve fraudulent LLCs.

In February 2026, the Wyoming House of Representatives voted to table a bill previously passed through the senate that would have required registered agents to keep more information about business owners that registered in the state without having a physical operating location there, aiming to reduce fraud. The bill was sponsored by Sen. Barry Crago, R-Buffalo and passed the state senate 23–8. Crago argued the bill would require the information be maintained by the registered agent, and would only be given to law enforcement upon subpoena. Secretary of State Chuck Gray argued against the bill on the basis of potential lost revenue as a result of reduced privacy. The bill was moved to the House Corporations, Elections and Political Subdivisions Committee, where they voted to table the legislation, blocking it from further review that session.

== See also ==
- Beneficial ownership
- Corporate haven
- Shell corporation
- Wyoming House of Representatives
