= Rob Monster =

American technology executive (born 1966/1967)

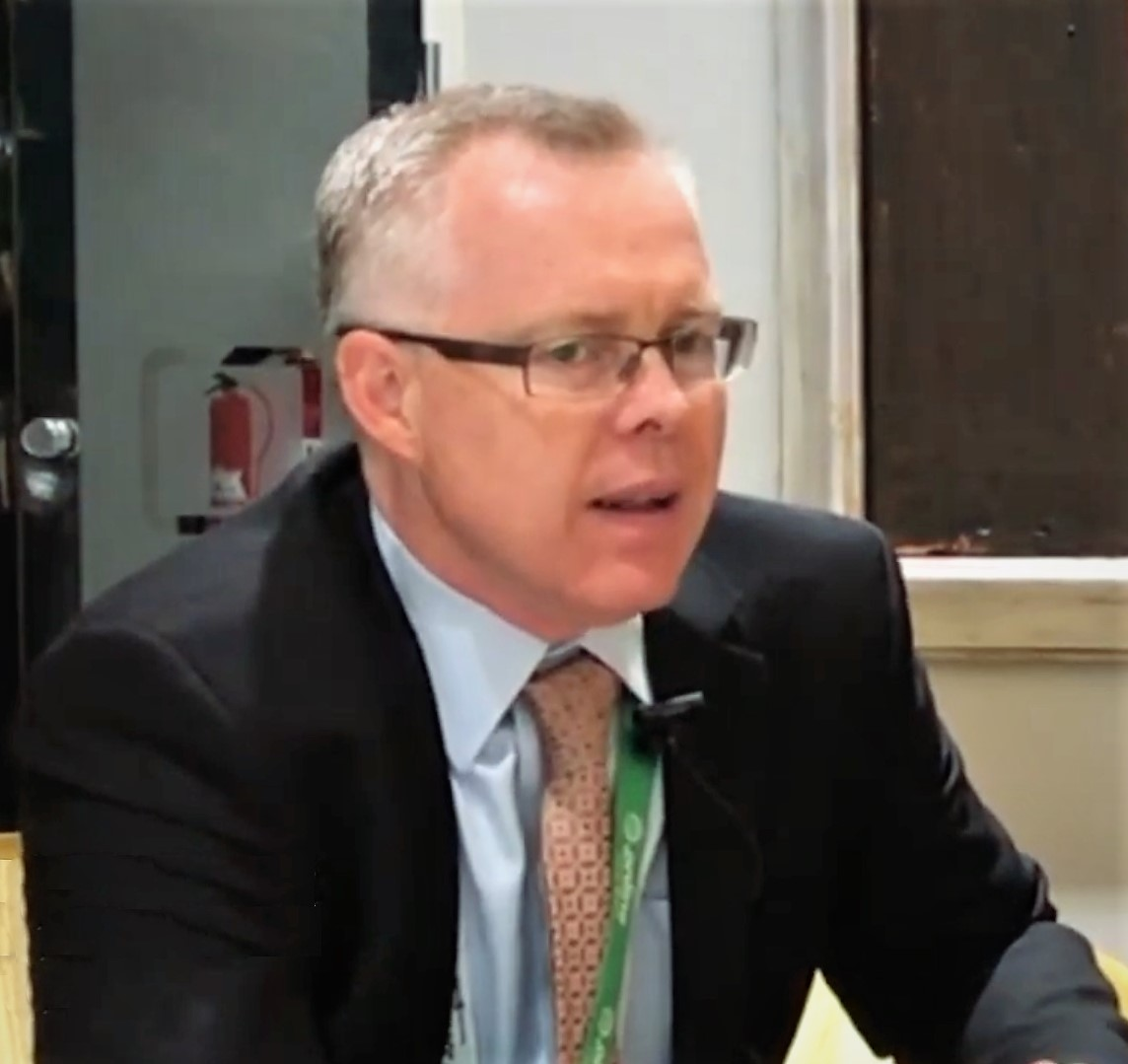
- Monster speaks about DigitalTown in 2017.
- Born: Robert W. Monster; 1966 or 1967 (age 58–59)
- Education: Cornell University (BS and MBA)
- Known for: Epik
- Spouse: Jill Monster
- Children: 5

Robert W. Monster (born 1966 or 1967) is a Dutch-American technology executive. He is the founder, former chief executive officer, and former chairman of Epik, a domain registrar and web host known for providing services to websites that host far-right, and extremist content.

He has received media attention in relation to Epik, particularly surrounding his 2018 statements about Epik customer Gab, a social network known for its far-right userbase. He has also received attention for controversial statements, including some in which he has promoted various conspiracy theories.

Monster was removed as Epik CEO in September 2022, and was later sued for mishandling client funds. Epik sold to a new entity and proceeds were used to settle lawsuits and debts. Monster was later held liable for a breach of settlement in one of the cases involving Epik and was personally ordered to pay more than $349,000, with interest, in June 2025.

== Life and education ==
Monster was born in 1966 or 1967 to a Dutch American family, and he grew up in Philadelphia, Pennsylvania. He holds Dutch and American citizenship. Monster's father, Arie Willem Monster, was a Fulbright Program scholar and taught computer science at Temple University. Monster's paternal grandfather, also named Arie Willem Monster, was a reserve medical officer for the Netherlands Army during the Nazi German occupation of the country in World War II. Monster's maternal grandfather also resisted German occupation by providing shelter and food for Allied paratroopers.

Monster attended Germantown Friends School in Philadelphia. As a child, he was often sent to the Netherlands during the summer to work on his maternal grandparents' farm. Monster's grandfather paid him to do the work, resulting in Monster developing an interest in money and trading on the stock market at the age of 12. He earned his bachelor's degree and MBA at Cornell University.

In 2007, Monster became a Christian. In 2013, he said:

There are people that humanity has discarded. We actually will talk to people that others might discard, but part of the reason why we talk to them is because we believe there's an opportunity to appeal to their higher selves.

Monster is married to Jill Monster, a naturopath. They have five children, and live in Sammamish, Washington.

Monster has a Twitter account on which he makes posts alluding to God and prayer.

== Career ==
=== Marketing (1991–2007) ===
Monster began working for Procter & Gamble in 1991, and spent years working in Japan and Germany in this role. In his last year, he was the global product development manager for Pampers, a brand of baby diapers. After eight years at the company, he left in 1999 to move to Seattle, Washington and founded Global Market Insite (GMI), an online market research company. He served as the CEO for seven years, until he was ousted by the board in 2007. This was rumoured to be because of mispreresentation of the revenue structure of the company to an acquirer of the company. Despite this, Monster remained on the company's board and profited when GMI was purchased by WPP plc. In 2005, he won the Entrepreneur of the Year award from Ernst & Young. Monster briefly retired at the age of 40 before getting involved in domain name speculation.

=== Technology (2009–present) ===
==== Epik ====
Monster founded Epik, a domain registrar and web hosting company, in 2009 in Sammamish, Washington. Rob was replaced as Epik CEO by Brian Royce in September 2022 after Epik co-mingled millions of dollars of customer Escrow funds into general company spending.

Monster has been an outspoken defender of Epik's choice to host far-right and other extremist content that other web hosts have refused to host, saying that the company is committed to protecting "lawful free speech". He learned about Gab, a far-right social network, in 2018 when the company received media attention after it was discovered that the perpetrator of the Pittsburgh synagogue shooting had used the service to post extremist content. After it was dropped by its registrar, GoDaddy, he met with Gab CEO Andrew Torba and agreed to register the website. The BBC reported Monster as saying that Gab's founder Andrew Torba was "doing something that looks useful", and that Gab's removal from the internet was "digital censorship". He subsequently became an active user and defender of the network. He has received media attention for publicly defending violent neo-Nazi Gab users, maligning people who criticize the site and call for stricter moderation, and making unsubstantiated claims that racist users are fake accounts created to hurt the site's reputation. Shortly after agreeing to host Gab, Monster contacted the King County Sheriff's Office to report a suspicious vehicle in his neighborhood, saying that it could be linked to threats he was receiving from "radical leftists." He would contact the Sheriff's Office to report several more threats, including a "glitter bomb" he received in the mail and his neighbours having files about Monster being put on their property.

After the 2019 Christchurch mosque shootings, Monster made a post on Gab informing users where they could find the shooter's manifesto on a peer-to-peer network he called "effectively uncensorable", and suggested his web service could also be used this way. Monster later told CNN that he did not intend to use the shooting as a marketing ploy, saying that the link to the shooter's manifesto and the promotional content "should not have been in the same post." He also condemned both the Pittsburgh and Christchurch shootings, saying that "Those shootings in holy places were evil" and "I believe life is precious, and I pray that the families impacted by such senseless violence find peace."

Monster also previously defended the idea of hosting 8chan, a far-right imageboard known for its hateful content, connections to multiple mass shootings, and hosting of child pornography. Epik briefly hosted 8chan after Cloudflare terminated services for the site, after the perpetrator of the 2019 El Paso shooting allegedly used it to post his justification for the shooting. The following day Epik was banned from their primary hardware provider Voxility because of their services to 8chan, taking 8chan, The Daily Stormer, and other Epik customers offline. Monster wrote the day after the ban from Voxility that he had changed his decision to provide services to the imageboard site due to them "propagat[ing] hate.", although Ars Technica noted in August 2019 that the company had only stopped providing 8chan with content hosting services, and had taken on providing the site's DNS services. Monster also stopped providing services to The Daily Stormer.

The Daily Telegraph described Monster in 2021 as "a key figure in the far-right's battle to stay online". Michael Edison Hayden, a researcher with the Southern Poverty Law Center (SPLC), has said that many harmful websites would not be on the internet if it were not for Epik, and that "No one is saying that Rob Monster himself is going out there and making terroristic threats, but if he doesn't want to be associated with this brand, he can certainly step up and say, 'absolutely, I don't want anything to do with this material. But he's not doing that.'" Monster himself has joked that he is the "Lex Luthor of the Internet".

===== Exit from Epik =====
Epik asked Rob Monster to step down as CEO in September 2022 after he was blamed for the company's debt. Brian Royce was named as his successor and Monster was made Board Chaiman.

In April 2023, a lawsuit naming Epik and Rob Monster was filed demanding a refund for a domain that was purchased, but reportedly not delivered. The lawsuit stated Matthew Adkisson paid $327,000 for a domain, but when it was not delivered, he'd only received $20,000 as a refund. Adkisson also alleged that Monster had promised to refund the money himself if Epik failed to do so. Epik's attorney acknowledged that Adkisson's funds were "misapprorpiated and used to pay other debts without his authorization." Brian Royce requested to be removed from the lawsuit citing his tenure as CEO began in late 2022 following Monster's removal.

Wired reported in February 2024 that Monster was alleged to have withdrawn more than $1.5 million from the company, in addition to close to $2 million being used to fund Kingdom Ventures, Monster's venture capital firm.

Epik sold its domain registrar and hosting platform to a new entity Epik LLC, which is part of Registered Agents Inc, in June 2023, with debts and lawsuits to be paid as part of the purchase. Adkisson and Monster agreed that $100,000 was to be paid directly by Monster to Adkisson by May 31, 2024.

In February 2025, Adkisson filed a notice of breach of settlement against Monster and Monster's wife in King County claiming the settlement had not been paid. Monster filed paperwork in dispute stating all $427,000 was paid when Epik sold. In June 2025, a judge ordered Monster to pay $349,401.61, and that interest would be added as time went on until it is paid. The judgment fell on Monster's and his wife's assets.

A separate lawsuit came to fruition in November 2025 that ordered Rob Monster to pay $1.37 million in addition to returning 5.19 bitcoin to a customer claiming Epik withheld proceeds from domain sales. In total, Monster is required to pay $1.94 million. Epik's former entity and Monsterbucks were included in the suit, but are no longer active.

==== Other companies ====
In 2015, Monster became the interim CEO for DigitalTown, a company that provides community-building platforms. He resigned from this position in 2018 in what was described as a planned departure to allow him to focus on Epik.

Monster founded Toki, a company which provides servers to be distributed in Africa and Asia. It's built on Raspberry Pi, an inexpensive single-board computer and runs a Linux-based operating system named TokiOS. The servers are powered either by a wired electrical connection or battery power; they connect to the Internet, but if no connection is available, they allow users to access preloaded digital content including educational resources, books, maps, and religious content. The servers use technology that Toki says could filter content to avoid some sources of information, or bypass local censorship rules. They also run a search engine which they say is "censorship-resistant".

In 2019, Monster founded the company eRise, which will distribute the devices created by Toki. The servers are still in development, but the company plans to begin distributing them in 2022 or 2023.

Joan Donovan, the director of the Technology and Social Change Research Project at the Shorenstein Center on Media, Politics and Public Policy, has compared the goals of Toki and eRise to the controversial Internet.org project: "We've seen a similar tactic by Facebook, to provide digital access points that can also serve the purpose of delivering favorable content and ensuring that these groups become dependent on your benevolence... It becomes that much harder later on to change the power dynamics when the ideology is in the infrastructure."

== Views ==
Monster's political beliefs were described by HuffPost in 2018 as "at times ... almost indistinguishable from those of the neo-Nazis he's defended on Gab." The Daily Telegraph said in 2021 that "his comments veer between free speech protectionism and implying support for the type of content his clients carry". CNN described Monster in 2021 as "an outspoken born-again Christian". Monster describes his own views as Christian libertarianism. Monster has said he is not a free speech absolutist, pointing to his and Epik's decisions to deny services to 8chan and The Daily Stormer as an example of his unwillingness to service companies that cross a "bright line", in this case the "possibility of violent radicalization on the platform". Bobby Allyn wrote for NPR in February 2021: "Yet his self-professed boundaries become squishy upon examination", giving an example where Monster "demurred" on questions about Epik's choice to platform Gab, where white supremacist founder of The Daily Stormer Andrew Anglin had 17,000 followers as of the story's publication. William Turton and Joshua Brustein wrote in Bloomberg Businessweek in April 2021 that Monster had "been radicalized during the Trump years, subjecting his staff to florid conspiracy theories in staff meetings and spending more and more of his energy on politically charged work at Epik."

In December 2018, Monster shared on Gab a video created by Canadian white nationalist Faith Goldy, in which she described migrants as bringing "rape epidemics, sharia law, and the spectacle of terror." In January 2019, Monster appeared as a guest on The People's Square, a podcast hosted by pseudonymous white nationalist Eric Striker. The SPLC criticized him for appearing on the show and for comments he made about white supremacist and former Grand Wizard of the Ku Klux Klan David Duke, including "He's actually a pretty clever guy, he's articulate. He knows history. And I don't know the body of his work, but have a feeling that many people grew up with this mindset that you shouldn't listen to anything David Duke says." Monster later told the SPLC in an interview that he did not know who Striker was when he agreed to speak with him, and that he "disagrees with Duke's racist worldview but respects his intelligence". In an interview with NPR in February 2021, Monster suggested that leaders in the white supremacist movement are "shock jocks" and should not be taken seriously. David Kaye, law professor at the University of California, Irvine and an expert in online speech, said of Monster's comment: "He can say they're just 'shock jocks,' but what we actually see is real world harm coming from the platforms. So how much is somebody who is allowing that content to be hosted operating in real good faith?"

Monster has been accused of antisemitism, which he has denied. In a 2018 Gab post he wrote, "Are there a lot of 'Jewish' people who are in a position of power or influence and favor other 'Jewish' people, Ashkenazi, or otherwise? Sure. Do I think God is impressed by that? No, I do not.... God will deal with them and in His time and His way regardless of hoaxes and conspiracies along the way." He also replied to a Gab user who referred to him using the antisemitic slur "rat kike" to say he was "not a 'kike' nor governed by one. :-)", and reassured a person who expressed disapproval that two members of Epik's board were Jewish that "having a Jewish person on Epik's board may be somewhat helping with keeping certain forces at bay." By 2020, both Jewish board members had resigned from Epik over ideological differences. In a 2018 comment on an Epik blog post explaining why the registrar accepted Gab's business, he wrote "I have many Jewish friends, and have been called 'Mensch' many times".

Monster was widely condemned in the wake of the 2019 Christchurch mosque shootings for uploading video of the shootings to Twitter and Gab. He posted on Gab that he had uploaded the file to the InterPlanetary File System (IPFS), and wrote that Epik was working on a tool to make it simpler for people to create IPFS files, describing IPFS as "crazy clever technology" that makes files "effectively uncensorable". The Washington Post later wrote that Monster had "used the moment as a marketing opportunity" to promote Epik's products. Monster also shared the link to the video on Twitter after Twitter announced it would be removing any video of the incident. His tweet was removed by Twitter after several hours. Monster made claims that the video of the Christchurch shooting was not real, and that the shooting had been a hoax. A former Epik staff member alleged that Monster had begun a company staff meeting by asking employees to watch the video of the shootings, saying that it would prove to them that the attack had been faked.

Monster has promoted several other conspiracy theories, including that the 2018 death of an American missionary who had traveled to North Sentinel Island was a "psyop" intended to discourage Christians from doing missionary work. Monster has also suggested that the 2018 Pittsburgh synagogue shooting and other mass casualty events were "false flag" attacks.

Monster believes that the mainstream media and Wikipedia spread propaganda, calling Wikipedia "a globalist tool".

== Published works ==
- Monster, Robert W.; Pettit, Raymond (October 2002). Market Research in the Internet Age: Leveraging the Internet for Market Measurement and Consumer Insight. Wiley. ISBN 978-0470820643.
