= Scanlation =

Fan translation of comics, often manga

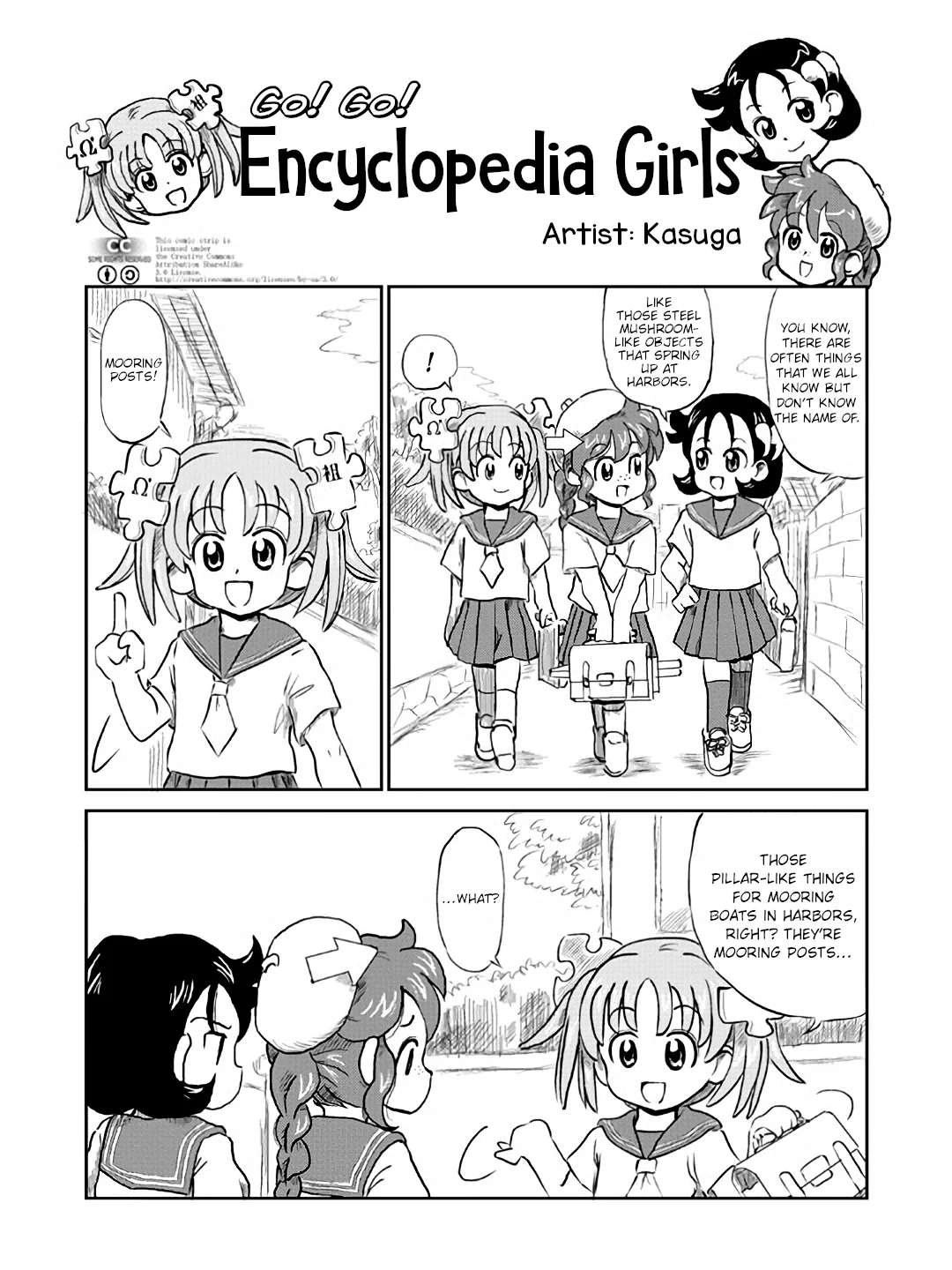
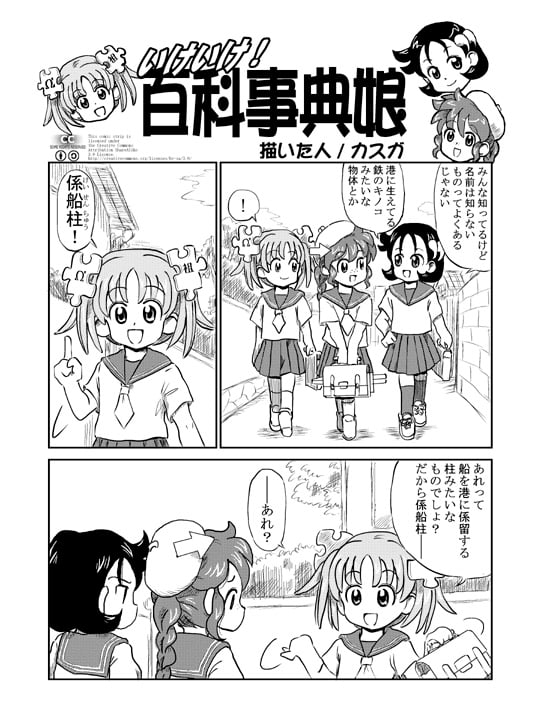
A manga page scanlated into English. The original Japanese "raw" was upscaled and cleaned of text. The script was translated and then typeset using a selection of fonts.

Scanlation (also scanslation) is the fan-made scanning, translation, and editing of comics from one language into another. Scanlation is done as an amateur work performed by groups and is nearly always done without express permission from the copyright holder. The word "scanlation" is a portmanteau of the words scan and translation. The term is mainly used for Japanese manga, although it also exists for other languages, such as Korean manhwa and Chinese manhua. Scanlations may be viewed at websites or as sets of image files downloaded via the Internet.

Scanlation (also scanslation) is a form of fan translation involving the digitisation, translation, editing and online distribution of comics. The term is a portmanteau of "scanning" and "translation", originally describing fans scanning and editing Japanese manga to share online. It later came to cover Korean manhwa and Chinese manhua, and is now used loosely for unauthorised translations of digital-first works such as vertical webtoons and web novels, even when no scanning occurs.

== History ==
Frederik L. Schodt has said he "dreamed of [manga translation] as far back as 1970 or 1971", and he, Jared Cook, Shinji Sakamoto, and Midori Ueda formed the group Dadakai, which Schodt called "really the beginning of manga translation" though "way too early" to get published. One of the works Dadakai licensed was Osamu Tezuka's Phoenix, later published by Viz Media from 2002 to 2008. The Amateur Press Association was an early formally organised form of manga scanlation, most active from the late 1970s through the early 1990s, and scanlation groups formed in Europe—largest in France—before the United States.

With the growth of the internet in the late 1990s, fans moved from translating scripts to editing translations onto scanned pages, first circulating them by mail, CDs, and email within anime clubs. By 1998 free hosts such as GeoCities and Angelfire carried scanlations, and scanlators gathered on the IRC channel #mangascans; organised groups emerged around 2000, including Mangascans, MangaProject, Toriyama's World, ShoujoMagic, and Project Omanga. Most groups observed an unspoken rule of dropping a series once it was officially licensed—for instance, Toriyama's World took down its scans after Viz licensed three of its most popular series. To help launch its Shonen Jump, Viz partnered with several scanlation groups, including Toriyama's World, sharing revenue through its affiliate program.

Faster broadband in the mid-2000s brought a boom in groups, weekly releases and aggregator sites. Publisher pressure intensified in 2010, when MangaHelpers removed hosted scanlations and OneManga dropped its manga library after Japanese and American publishers formed anti-piracy coalitions.

Scanlation later spread to webcomics and mobile formats; a 2021 report counted over 1,300 bootleg webcomic sites with billions of views worldwide. OCR and machine translation introduced automated workflows, though human editing remained important for natural dialogue and cultural jokes. Legal platforms such as Shueisha's MANGA Plus, WEBTOON and Tapas grew as alternatives offering simultaneous international releases.

Copyright holders increased legal pressure in the 2020s. MangaDex faced subpoenas and mass DMCA takedowns, and large aggregators such as Comick.io shut down after international investigations.

== Process ==
Scanlation is usually done by a group of fans who collaborate through the internet. Many scanlators actively communicate with each other, even with those of other groups, some even belonging to several groups at once; others choose to avoid communication completely. One former scanlator, by the pseudonym Stephen, noted that scanlators often fall into three types of cliques: those who belong to prestigious 'old guard' groups that have been active for several years, to newer groups that established themselves through hard work, or to fringe groups that attempt to undercut other groups attempting to best them via larger download count. Much stigma exists between the old and new. Stephen stated that Old Guard consider newer groups as "trend- or fame-whores" and thus choose to work on series that have more cultural or artistic significance whereas newer groups consider the Old Guard bitter losers who are no longer popular and tend to work on the more popular titles. Many groups have their own webpage as well as an IRC channel or a Discord server. These platforms are an important part of the community aspect, as they allow for real-time interaction between the group staff and the target audience as well as allowing the groups to recruit new staff.

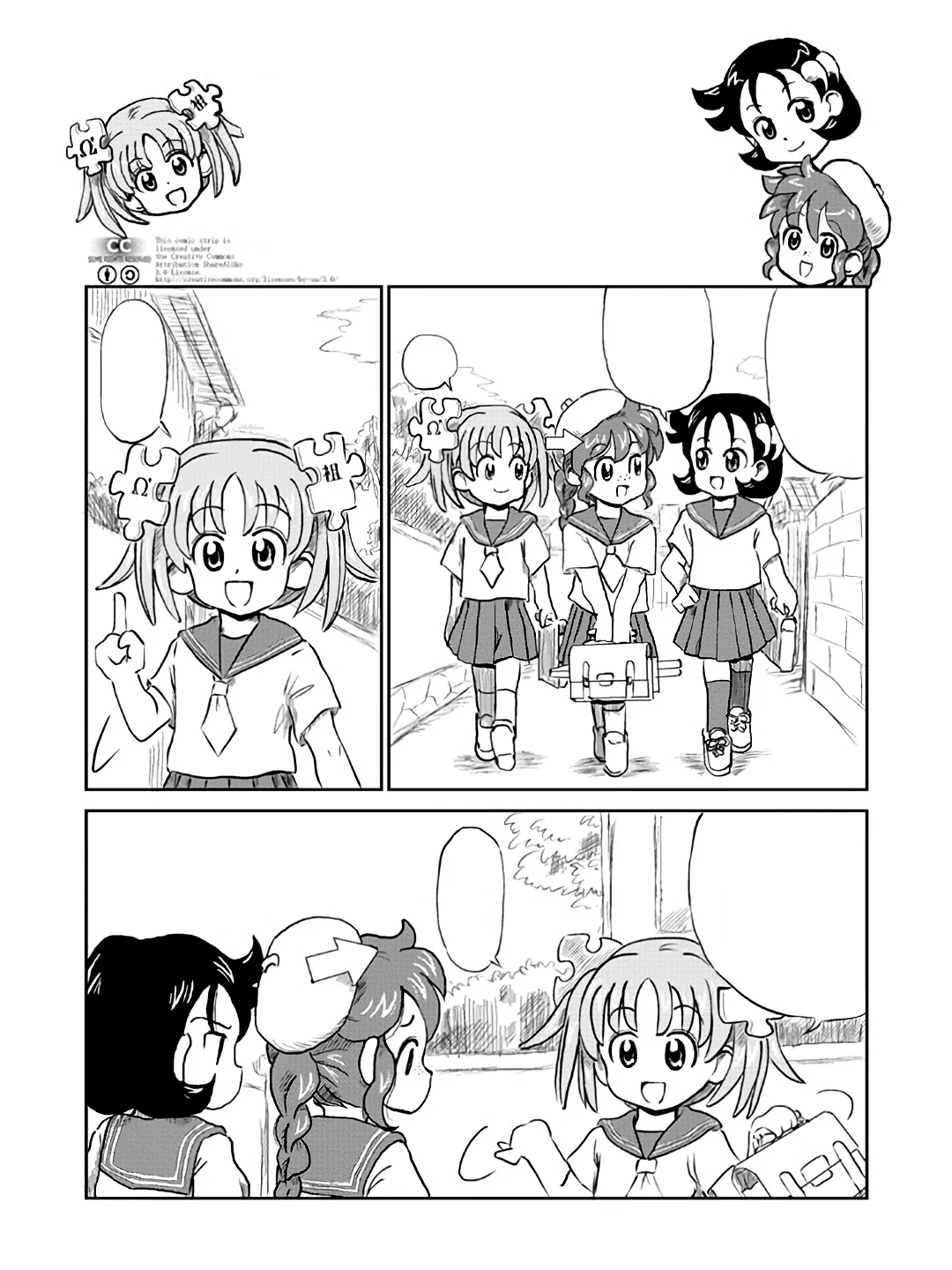
Part of scanlation involves cleaning, including the removal of text, among other processing.

Much like their earlier predecessors, the anime fansub community, scanlators tend to organize into groups and divide the labor amongst themselves. The first step in scanlation is to obtain the "raws" or the original content in print form, then to scan and send the images to the translator and the cleaner. The translator reads original text from the raws and translates into the desired language of release, then sends the translated text to a proof-reader to check for accuracy. The cleaner removes the original text, corrects blemishes that arose from scanning, adjusts brightness and contrast levels so that the finished product looks like officially published volumes, etc. The process of cleaning may also include the removal of text directly over artwork and results in blank spots interrupting the artwork. Depending on the scanlation group, these spots may be left as is or the artwork will be redrawn (usually performed by the cleaner as well). The typesetter then takes the translated text and places it into the 'cleaned' raw, making the translated texts fit in the dialogue boxes and selecting appropriate fonts for effect such as emphasis. Finally the translated, typeset manga is sent to the scanlation group's quality controller who copyedits the final product before releasing it to the websites that it will be viewed or downloaded from.

Scanlators often use digital photo and illustration editing software such as Adobe Photoshop (or less commonly, Clip Studio Paint) to clean, redraw, and typeset the scanlations.

Scanlation groups primarily make their releases available through their own sites or shared sites like MangaDex. The vast amount of manga released and multitude of scanlation groups – each with their own individual sites and methods of distribution, sometimes even competing scanlations of the same manga – gave rise to sites such as MangaUpdates that specialize in tracking and linking these releases. Jake T. Forbes, a manga editor and columnist, stated at a Comic-Con 2010 panel that scanlation aggregator sites that offer many different titles all in one place have recently become part of the distribution process.

== Motivations and ethics ==
While early official translations of manga focused on localizing the manga to an Anglophone culture, scanlations retained the cultural differences, for example, leaving in forms of address, romanizing sound effects and onomatopoeia instead of translating them, and providing the manga unflipped. This minimalist approach to translation has been referred to as "enculturation". Sound effects can also be left untranslated in scanlations, creating an evocative Japanese atmosphere. The reader can often infer the meaning of the sound effects from the context or lettering choices.

Fans are often quite unhappy with the translation industry for various reasons. Patrick Macias, a columnist for The Japan Times Weekly described fans "addicted to page-turning narratives" as impatient with the "agonizingly" slow pace at which official translations are released. Douglass, Huber and Manovich say that enthusiasm by fans about a particular series, coupled with delays in official translations led to the formation of scanlation groups. Scanlators say that they scanlate to promote the series or the author in their own language, but Hope Donovan suggests that the scanlator's goal is more along the lines of "self-promotion", and argues that it is prestigious for a scanlator to have many fans.

As many titles do not get licensed in most countries, or licensed in any foreign country, scanlation groups allow a much wider audience access to the content. The owner of the now defunct manga-hosting site Ignition-One, Johnathan, stated that "The entire reason I joined the scanlations community is to promote manga that I was interested in and, coincidentally, that no one else would translate." Also this practice is common for some manga discontinued due to lack of popularity or sales in the target region.

In other cases, scanlation groups are formed to get around perceived or actual censorship in the official translation or in the decision to obtain the series license. "Caterpillar" of former Caterpillar's Nest scanlation group, in reference to erotic content that his group released, stated that "I started doing scanlations because I wanted to read certain manga and I knew they didn't stand a snowflake's chance in hell of ever getting an official English translation." In the yaoi fandom, commercially published explicit titles are often restricted to readers aged 18 or above, and there is a tendency for booksellers to stock BL, but also insist that more of it is shrink-wrapped and labeled for adult readers. Andrea Wood has suggested that teenage yaoi fans seek out more explicit titles using scanlations.

The quality of commercial offerings is a common complaint. Localization is also a common complaint among supporters of scanlations. Commercial releases often have titles, names, puns, and cultural references changed to make more sense to their target audience. The act of horizontally 'flipping' the pages of commercial releases has also received criticism from fans of manga. The reason for this change is that manga panels are arranged from right to left, while the panels in Western comics are arranged from left to right. However, due to large-scale fan complaints that this 'flipping' has changed the finished product from the original (e.g. A flipped manga image will keep the speech translations legible, while any graphics such as the wording on clothes or buildings will be reversed and confusing), this practice has largely diminished.

The cost and speed of commercial releases remains an issue with some fans. Imported comics from the original countries' markets sometimes cost less than the commercially released version, despite the high cost of shipping. Despite weekly or monthly serialized releases in the country of origin, translated editions often take longer to release due to the necessity of translating and repackaging the product before release.

A more recent phenomenon amongst scanlation readers is the emergence of ereaders. Users may read scanlations on devices such as the Amazon Kindle. Since most scanlations are distributed as a series of images, many e-book readers already have the capability to read scanlations without additional software. Many manga have not been released in a digital format that is compatible with e-book readers, making piracy the only avenue for readers who wish to read on these devices.

== Legal action ==
Scanlations are often viewed by fans as the only way to read comics that have not been licensed for release in their area. However, according to international copyright law, such as the Berne Convention, scanlations are illegal.

According to a 2009 study conducted by Lee Hye-Kyung of the University of London with Japanese manga publishers, those publishers generally stated that they considered scanlation "an overseas phenomenon", and no "coordinated action" had taken place against scanlation. Lee stated that a possible explanation for some of the lack of legal action is that scanlation groups always make sure to buy an original copy of the work and generally stop scanlating should the work become licensed.

Historically, copyright holders have not requested scanlators to stop distribution before a work is licensed in the translated language. Thus, scanlators usually feel it is relatively 'safe' to scanlate series which have not been commercially released in their country. Steve Kleckner, a former VP of sales for Tokyopop, stated that "Frankly, I find it kind of flattering, not threatening... To be honest, I believe that if the music industry had used downloading and file sharing properly, it would have increased their business, not eaten into it." However, this view is not necessarily shared among the industry, as some Japanese publishers have threatened scanlation groups with legal action. Since the 1990s, publishers have sent cease and desist letters to various scanlation groups and websites.

Due to manga's popularity steadily increasing in the overseas market, copyright holders felt that scanlators were intruding on their sales and in 2010, a group of 36 Japanese publishers and a number of US publishers banded together to form the Manga Multi-national Anti-Piracy Coalition to "combat" illegal scanlations, especially mentioning scanlation aggregator websites. They have threatened to take legal action against at least thirty, unnamed websites. The coalition has achieved some degree of success. The scanlation aggregator site OneManga, ranked 935 in the entire internet in May 2010 according to a Google listing and top 300 in the United States, announced its closure in July 2010 due to their respect towards the displeasure expressed by the publishers, while OneManga officially shut down its online reader in August 2010.

Some scanlations leak before the manga is even published in the Japanese weekly magazines. As of April 2014, the Japanese government was looking into amending copyright law to more effectively target translated scans. A 2014 estimate was that lost revenue from scanlations amounted to "560 billion yen per year in only four major cities in China".

In 2020, a Haesin Young, a manhwa artist, threatened legal action against a piracy website asking users to stop illegally uploading the manhwa. In 2021, Lezhin said that they are working with law firms to bring legal charges against manga piracy sites, after accusations from several manhwa authors, including manhwa artist YD, that scanlation causes authors to lose money and motivation. Moreover, the Korean government and Interpol initiated a three-year-long cooperative investigation in April, aiming to arrest individuals engaging in illegal distribution of pirated and illegally translated comics, cartoons and novels.

== Reception ==
Patrick Macias wrote for The Japan Times that there seems to be an unspoken agreement between scanlators and publishers; once a series obtains an English-language license, English-language scanlators are expected to police themselves. Most groups view the act of scanlation as treading upon a 'gray area' of legality. Johnathan, owner of the now defunct scanlation sharing site Ignition-One, acknowledged that scanlations are illegal no matter what scanlation groups might say; however, unlike the manner in which the advent of the MP3 format marked the age of sharing music that harmed the music industry, he believed that scanlating manga in contrast encouraged domestic publishers to license manga.

Jake T. Forbes, an editor and columnist, criticized the work of scanlation groups in that they in no way are in "legal grey area" and are blatant copyright infringement. He further criticized the community for lacking the right and qualifications to know whether or not scanlation is positive or negative for the industry and the harm it caused, emphasizing the simple truth that the scanlation community is "not" the industry. He describes the current fandom as taking "unfettered" access to copyrighted works "for granted" due to advent of torrents and scanlations.

Jason Thompson, a freelance editor with deep involvement in the manga industry, stated that although manga companies never mention them, they have placed paying increasing amounts of attention towards scanlations as a means of gauging a title's popularity and the presence of a fanbase. Some licensing companies, such as Del Rey Manga, Tokyopop, and Viz Media, have used the response to various scanlations as a factor in deciding which manga to license for translation and commercial release. Steve Kleckner, former VP of sales for Tokyopop, stated that "hey, if you get 2,000 fans saying they want a book you've never heard of, well, you gotta go out and get it." Toren Smith, a translator, felt differently, stating that, "I know from talking to many folks in the industry that scanlations DO have a negative effect. Many books that are on the tipping point will never be legally published because of scanlations."

Johanna Draper Carlson says that some readers of scanlations do not wish to spend money, or that they have limited mobility or funds, or that they are choosy about which series they wish to follow. Carlson feels that the readers of scanlations "do not care" that scanlations are illegal. Forbes describes the cost of keeping up with new manga as "astronomical", stating that "fans expecting to read any manga they want for free isn't reasonable, but neither is it reasonable to expect your audience to pay hundreds or thousands of dollars a year to stay up to date with content that their Japanese kindred spirits can get for a quarter the cost."

Forbes urged the scanlation community to instead direct their energies toward providing original, creative content as opposed to infringing on copyright laws. He addressed the fandom's criticism of the lack of quality in official translations stating that it should manifest as discussion. In regards to bridging the gap between cultures, he mentioned translating what Japanese bloggers have to say. Finally, he addressed the fame-seeking side of the scanlation community by stating that they should try their hand at creating fan art instead of placing their name on an unofficial translation of copyrighted material.

During a panel on digital piracy in Comic-Con 2010, the comic and music critic and writer for Techland, Douglas Wolk, expressed concern in response to the actions of Manga Multi-national Anti-Piracy Coalition stating that he had seen the music industry "destroy" itself by "alienating its most enthusiastic customer base" in attempts to fight piracy. Forbes, also a panelist, agreed, criticizing publishers for this direct retaliation; Forbes stated that publishers were not realizing that consumers wanted a large amount of content so they could browse rather than picking and choosing individual items. Deb Aoki, panelist and manga editor for About.com, stated that this was exactly what scanlation aggregator sites provided consumers. Forbes highlighted that until recently scanlations were not problematic; however, aggregator sites were appearing which made scanlations much more readily accessible and which run like businesses, functioning off of ad revenue while the artist and scanlation groups received nothing.
