= Shōnen Jump =

Shōnen Jump or Shonen Jump may refer to:

- Weekly Shōnen Jump, a Japanese manga anthology magazine published by Shueisha since 1968
- Jump (magazine line)
  - Shōnen Jump+, a digital magazine and mobile application started in 2014
  - Monthly Shōnen Jump, a former sister publication of Weekly Shōnen Jump, published from 1970 to 2007
  - Shonen Jump (magazine), a former American manga anthology magazine based on Weekly Shōnen Jump and published by Viz Media from 2002 to 2012
  - Weekly Shonen Jump (American magazine), a former American digital publication that replaced the print-based Shonen Jump, published by Viz Media from 2012 to 2018, formerly named Weekly Shonen Jump Alpha
