= Content Overseas Distribution Association =

Japanese trade association

- コンテンツ海外流通促進機構
- Formation: August 2002; 23 years ago
- Headquarters: Tokyo, Japan
- Website: coda-cj.jp/en/

The Content Overseas Distribution Association (CODA) (Note: Japanese: コンテンツ海外流通促進機構, Hepburn: Kontentsu Kaigai Ryūtsū Sokushin Kikō) is a Japanese trade association based in Tokyo. It was established in August 2002 as a voluntary organization, with support from the Ministry of Economy, Trade and Industry and the Agency for Cultural Affairs, for international distribution of Japanese content (frequently anime and manga) and taking countermeasures against piracy. In 2009, it was registered as a general incorporated association.

In 2013, CODA merged with Anti-Counterfeiting Association (ACA), in order to strengthen their capability for copyright protection and offer comprehensive measures against copyright infringement in Japan as well as overseas.

In 2022, CODA established the International Anti-Piracy Organization (IAPO), with associating 32 members, the Motion Picture Association, and Copyright Society of China within approximately 450 members.

== Content Japan mark ==
Content Japan (or CJ Mark) was created in 2005 by the Anti-Counterfeiting Association, it can be seen on packages in music, videos and other media.

== Members ==
As of 2026, there are 36 companies, 11 organizations and 10 supporting members.

- Asmik Ace
- Aniplex
- Bandai
- Bandai Namco Filmworks
- Computer Entertainment Supplier's Association
- Cygames
- Fuji Television
- Hakuhodo DY Music & Pictures
- Kadokawa Corporation
- King Records
- Kodansha
- NHK
- Nikkatsu
- Nippon Animation
- Nippon Television
- Pony Canyon
- Recording Industry Association of Japan
- Shochiku
- Shogakukan
- Shogakukan-Shueisha Productions
- Shueisha
- Sony Music Entertainment Japan
- Square Enix
- Starto Entertainment
- Studio Ghibli
- Tezuka Productions
- TBS Television
- TMS Entertainment
- Toei Animation
- Toei Company
- Toho
- Tsuburaya Productions
- TV Asahi
- TV Tokyo
- Universal Music Japan
- Wowow
- Yoshimoto Kogyo
- Yomiuri Telecasting Corporation

== See also ==
- Alliance for Creativity and Entertainment, a similar anti-piracy organization for films and TV series
