= Kiwi Farms =

Web forum

- Website type: Forum
- Available in: English, with an "Internationale Clique" subforum for non-English discussions
- Owner: Joshua "Null" Moon
- Parent: 1776 Solutions LLC (previously Final Solutions LLC)
- Commercial: Yes
- Registration: Optional (required to participate and view certain content)
- Users: 16,000 daily logins, as of 2022
- Launched: February 4, 2013; 13 years ago

Kiwi Farms, formerly known as CWCki Forums (/ˈkwɪki/ KWIH-kee), is a web forum that facilitates the discussion and harassment of online figures and communities. Their targets are often subject to organized group trolling and stalking, as well as doxing and real-life harassment. Kiwi Farms has been tied to the suicides of three people who were victims of harassment by the website.

Kiwi Farms' connection to several controversies and harassment campaigns has caused the forum to be blocked by Internet service providers or refused service by companies. After the Christchurch mosque shootings, some Internet service providers in New Zealand blocked the site. In 2021, after the suicide of Near, a non-binary software developer who was subject to targeted and organized group harassment by members of the site, DreamHost stopped providing their domain registration services to Kiwi Farms. In September 2022, Kiwi Farms was blocked by Cloudflare due to "an imminent and emergency threat to human life". Following intermittent availability, The Daily Dot confirmed VanwaTech was providing content delivery network services to the site, which brought it back online. In September 2022, Kiwi Farms suffered a data breach; the site operator told users to assume that IP addresses, email addresses, and passwords had been leaked.

== History ==
Kiwi Farms was founded in 2013 by Joshua Conner Moon (known as "Null" on the website), a former 8chan administrator. It was originally launched as a forum website to troll and harass an individual originally noticed in 2007 on the Something Awful forums. Eventually, an Encyclopedia Dramatica page was created about them. A dedicated wiki, titled "CWCki" based on their initials, was created by people who felt that the Encyclopedia Dramatica entry was not detailed or accurate enough. Kiwi Farms was originally called "CWCki Forums" before "Kiwi Farms" was coined in 2014 as a corruption of the original name. It now hosts threads targeting many individuals, including minorities, women, LGBTQ people, neurodivergent people, people considered by Kiwi Farms users to be mentally ill or sexually deviant, feminists, journalists, Internet celebrities, and video game or comics hobbyists.

As of 2022, the site had 16,000 daily logins, according to the site's administrators. Katelyn Burns, who had been targeted by the site, described its audience as "terminally online people from a wide range of political ideologies, from far right and anti-trans feminist types to edgy lefties obsessed with consuming internet drama", while noting that "of particular interest to many of the site's users have been trans people, who they have labeled 'troons', a derogatory portmanteau of 'tranny' and 'goon'".

== Harassment ==
The targets of Kiwi Farms threads are often subject to organized group trolling, harassment, and stalking, including real-life harassment by users. The site targets transgender people, people with disabilities, and those its users believe to be neurodivergent. Targets of harassment are referred to on the forum as "lolcows", named after the idea that they can be "milked for laughs". Tactics include publishing their victims' personal information ("doxing"), trying to get them fired from their jobs, reporting crimes at their addresses in an attempt to have police dispatched to their homes ("swatting"), and harassing their family members and friends. Some of Kiwi Farms' harassment campaigns have continued for months or years, and some aim to drive the targets to suicide. Both the site's owner Moon and the userbase of Kiwi Farms have been described as antisemitic, with Kiwi Farms users targeting a transgender Jewish convert with antisemitic abuse.

Clara Sorrenti, a transgender activist and Twitch streamer under the name "Keffals", was doxxed on Kiwi Farms in a thread dedicated to discussing her. Users on the site posted personal information about her (e.g. addresses, phone numbers) as well as that of her friends and family. Users also leaked sexually explicit photos of her and made death threats. She was later swatted, arrested, and detained for over ten hours in August 2022 when someone stole her identity and sent fake emails to local politicians threatening mass violence. She was later cleared of any wrongdoing, and police acknowledged the incident as a swatting attempt. Users also posted the address of an unrelated man who lives in the same city and shares her last name, and police were also sent to his residence. After the swatting incident, Sorrenti said she moved out of her home and into a hotel for her safety. After she posted a photograph of her cat on the hotel bed, Kiwi Farms users identified the hotel from the bedsheets in the photograph, and sent multiple pizza orders to the hotel under her deadname. "Obviously, the pizza itself isn't the problem. It's the threat they send by telling me they know where I live and are willing to act on it in the real world," she said in a video after the incident. Sorrenti later fled the country after her location was identified again, reportedly by someone who hacked her Uber account. The incidents are being investigated as criminal harassment, and Sorrenti stated she intended to pursue legal action. Sorrenti also promoted a campaign to pressure Cloudflare into terminating its services to the website.

On August 24, 2022, U.S. Representative Marjorie Taylor Greene stated in an interview with Newsmax that she was swatted twice by an individual claiming to be Kiwi Farms moderator "AltisticRight". She demanded that the website be shut down, saying "There should be no business or any kind of service where you can target your enemy. That's absolutely absurd and this is the type of lawlessness that Democrats want all over the country". Cloudflare suspended a service to the website that allowed them to customize error messages in response.

A U.S. federal lawsuit stated that a video of an online streamer engaging in sexual acts had been published on Kiwi Farms in November 2024, after which the video spread onto pornography websites. The streamer claimed to have received "hundreds of insulting and harassing messages" and to have felt "increasingly humiliated, mortified and depressed, and start[ed] feeling suicidal" as a result of the video being distributed online.

=== Terminations of service ===
Kiwi Farms used services from Cloudflare, an American hosting and web security services provider. The services include DDoS protection, and distribution through Cloudflare's content delivery network. Following Kiwi Farms' harassment campaign against Sorrenti, in August 2022 a campaign was started to try to convince Cloudflare to stop providing services to the site. NBC News claims this was done in order to enable "debilitating virtual attacks" against Kiwi Farms. While Cloudflare initially defended their decision to keep working with Kiwi Farms, on September 3, 2022, Cloudflare officially blocked the site from using its services. People attempting to visit the site saw an error message explaining that the decision had been made due to "an imminent and emergency threat to human life". Cloudflare CEO Matthew Prince stated that the company acted because "the rhetoric on the Kiwifarms site and specific, targeted threats [had] escalated over the last 48 hours" at the time of the decision. Other middleware providers, such as hCaptcha, followed suit in halting support for Kiwi Farms.

Though the site was briefly offline due to "an unprecedented emergency and immediate threat to human life", it was back online "intermittently" on September 4, 2022, with the Russian-based service provider DDoS-Guard and a Russian domain that had been registered on July 12, 2021. NBC analyst and former FBI Assistant Director for Counterintelligence Frank Figliuzzi said that by switching to Russian servers, Kiwi Farms "could easily become an increased threat of domestic terror". DDoS-Guard stopped providing services to Kiwi Farms on September 5, 2022, also rendering the site's Russian domain inaccessible. The Internet Archive excluded Kiwi Farms from being archived at the Wayback Machine during this time.

Moon has since claimed that the takedown of Kiwi Farms was "an organized attack", and that there is "a coalition of criminals trying to frame the forum for their behavior" which provides "opportunities for professional victims to amplify their message". Moon also commented that he did not see a realistic scenario for Kiwi Farms to stay online. On September 6, 2022, The Daily Dot confirmed that VanwaTech was providing content delivery network services to the site, hence bringing it back online. Other websites running on VanwaTech infrastructure experienced availability problems as a result, including The Daily Stormer and 8chan.

=== Suicides of harassment targets ===
Harassment campaigns by Kiwi Farms users are known to have contributed to the suicides of at least three individuals. The Kiwi Farms community considers it a goal to drive its targets to suicide, and has celebrated such deaths with a counter on the website. They have used social media reporting systems to mass-report posts by harassment targets in which they have expressed suicidal thoughts or intentions, with the goal of reducing the possibility their targets receive help.

In 2013, American video game developer Chloe Sagal became a Kiwi Farms target after Eurogamer reported Sagal's Indiegogo crowdfunding campaign had been flagged for "suspicious activity". Sagal had raised over $30,000 on the platform for metal poisoning treatment to remove shrapnel from a car accident, but Eurogamer reported that Sagal had actually intended to use the proceeds for sex reassignment surgery. Sagal later died via self-immolation on June 19, 2018, which several reports attributed to years of harassment from Kiwi Farms.

Julie Terryberry, a Canadian woman, died by suicide in 2016 following sustained harassment from Kiwi Farms users. Following Terryberry's death, Joshua Moon posted a note on the forum claiming that Kiwi Farms and its users had no responsibility for the suicide.

In a Twitter thread posted on June 27, 2021, Near, a pseudonymous Japan-based software developer known for their work on the video game emulator higan, described long-term harassment from Kiwi Farms users. Near, who was non-binary, said that they had endured lifelong bullying but that the abuse had recently centralized around Kiwi Farms, which had "made the harassment orders of magnitude worse". Near stated that they and their friends had been doxxed and goaded into suicide by members of the website, and that Near had been mocked for being autistic. On June 28, Hector Martin posted a link to a Google Doc which he said came from a mutual friend of his and Near's, which said that Near had died by suicide, and alleged that the harassment from Kiwi Farms amounted to murder. Martin subsequently reported on June 28 that he had spoken to police who confirmed that Near had died the previous day. USA Today reported on July 23, 2021, that it had confirmed with Near's former employer that they had died.

== Christchurch mosque shootings ==
In March 2019, Kiwi Farms republished both the livestream and the manifesto of Brenton Tarrant, the perpetrator of the 2019 Christchurch mosque shootings. Shortly after, website owner Joshua Moon publicly denied a request by New Zealand Police to voluntarily hand over all data on posts about the shooting, including the email and IP addresses of forum posters. Moon responded aggressively and mockingly, calling New Zealand a "shithole country", and stated that he did not "give a single solitary fuck what section 50 of your faggot law (referring to the Policing Act 2008) says about sharing [the New Zealand Police's] email." He deemed the request a censorship attempt and maintained that New Zealand authorities "do not have the clout to eradicate a video from the Internet" and "do not have the legal reach to imprison everyone whose [sic] posted it." Kiwi Farms was one of several websites blocked by New Zealand Internet service providers after the attack. In New Zealand, those who were caught possessing or sharing images or videos of the attack faced charges that could result in 14-year prison sentences.

== Legal disputes ==
=== Contributory copyright infringement lawsuit ===
In 2020, pro se litigant Russell Greer filed a contributory copyright infringement lawsuit against Joshua Moon and Kiwi Farms. Greer had previously emailed Moon a DMCA takedown notice after website users had shared the entirety of his 2017 self-published book Why I Sued Taylor Swift and How I Became Falsely Known as Frivolous, Litigious, and Crazy, in addition to one of his songs, as well as his other copyrighted works. In response to Greer's takedown notice, Moon published it to the forum. The case was dismissed in 2021 when the court ruled that Greer had failed to show that Moon and Kiwi Farms had "intentionally caused, induced, or materially contributed to the direct infringement". In October 2023, the United States Court of Appeals for the Tenth Circuit reversed the lower court's dismissal and remanded the case to proceed in a lower court. In March 2024, the defendants filed a petition for certiorari to the Supreme Court of the United States to overturn the reversal, which was rejected in May 2024.

=== Defamation lawsuit ===
In May 2023, developer advocate Liz Fong-Jones brought a defamation case against the Brisbane-based company Flow Chemical and its director, Vincent Zhen. The lawsuit alleged that the company was helping to keep Kiwi Farms, which has doxxed and targeted her and other LGBTQ people, online. Because Flow Chemical and Zhen did not defend the case, an interlocutory judgment was made against them in July 2023, and in October 2023 they were ordered to pay Fong-Jones A$445,000 plus costs.

=== Ofcom lawsuit ===
In August 2025, Lolcow LLC and the imageboard 4chan's managing company filed a lawsuit against the British government's Office of Communication (Ofcom) in the United States District Court for the District of Columbia. The lawsuit stated that the Office of Communication, while enforcing the Online Safety Act, had threatened to impose civil penalties and conduct arrests against the two companies for actions that are lawful and constitutionally protected in the United States. The complaint demanded that the court declare that actions were in defiance of the first, fourth and fifth American constitutional amendments, and asked the court to impose a permanent injunction prohibiting the agency from enforcing the Act against US-based companies.
