= Driver =

Driver may refer to:

== Transportation ==
- Co-driver
- Driver (operator), the occupation or role in driving
  - Professional driver
  - Chauffeur, a person who drives an automobile as a job
  - Motorman (locomotive), an electric vehicle driver
  - Bus driver
  - Truck driver
- Driver (sail), a type of sail
- Driver Group, an Australian bus company
- SS Empire Driver or SS Driver, a cargo ship
- Train driver

== Construction ==
- Pile driver
- Screwdriver, mechanical device used to tighten or loosen screws

== People ==
- Driver (surname)

== Places ==
- Driver, Arkansas, United States
- Driver, Northern Territory, Australia
- Drivers, Illinois, United States
- Driver, Virginia, United States

== Sport ==
- Driver (golf), a golf club
- Driver, a type of disc golf disc
- Driver, a position in water polo
- Driver, a kind of throw in professional wrestling

== Computing and electronics ==
- Driver (software), software that provides a programming interface for interacting with something via a lower-level interface
  - Database driver, for interacting with a database
  - Device driver, for interacting with a hardware device
- Driver circuit, in electronics, a circuit or component used to control another circuit or component
- In 3D computer animation, a driver of a property animates its value over time based some other property
- Speaker driver, a transducer in a loudspeaker

== Military ==
- HMS Driver, two British Royal Navy ships
- Driver (rank), British army rank

== Arts and entertainment ==
- Driver (series), series of video games
  - Driver (video game), the first game in the series
  - Driver 2, the second game in the series
  - Driver 3, the third game in the series
  - Driver: Parallel Lines, the fourth game in the series
  - Driver 76, a 2007 PSP game
  - Driver: Vegas, a 2005 mobile game
  - Driver: L.A. Undercover, a 2007 mobile game
  - Driver: San Francisco, the fifth game in the series
  - Driver: Renegade, a 2011 3DS game
- Driver (Adult Mom album), 2021
- "Driver" (Blue October song), 2016
- Driver (Ferron album), 1994
- "Driver" (Soccer Mommy song), 2024
- Faster, a 2010 film known as Driver in certain English-speaking countries/regions
- Taxi Driver

== See also ==
- The Driver (disambiguation)
- Drive (disambiguation)
- Drover (disambiguation)
- Pilot (disambiguation)
- Dorylus, the driver ant
- Driving moccasins or "drivers"
