= The Driver (disambiguation) =

The Driver is a 1978 crime film.

The Driver may also refer to:

- The Driver (TV series), a British crime drama television serial
- The Driver (Buddy Rich album), 1960
- The Driver (Charles Kelley album), 2016
- The Driver (novel), a novel by Garet Garrett
- The Driver, a song by Bastille from the mixtape Other People's Heartache, Pt. 2
- "The Driver", a 2015 song by Scottish musician Momus from his album Turpsycore
- "The Driver", a character from Silver Pines

== See also ==
- Drive (disambiguation)
- Driver (disambiguation)
