= Driver (surname) =

Driver is a surname of German origin, which referred to someone from the ancient Celtic tribe of Treveri who once inhabited the lower valley of the Moselle between France, Belgium and Germany. The name was originally Trever and has other variants such as Treviri, Triver, Trevor, or Trier. In England, it is an occupational surname meaning the driver of horses or oxen attached to a cart or plough, or of loose cattle. It is recorded since the thirteenth century.

== List of people with the surname Driver ==
- Alfred Carter (cricketer), Australian Rules footballer who played for four seasons (1888–1891) under the assumed surname "Driver"
- Adam Driver (born 1983), American actor
- Alexander Gooch and Alice Driver (both died 1558), English Protestant martyrs
- Andrew Driver (born 1987), English footballer
- Arthur Driver (1909–1981), Australian engineer, army officer, and public servant
- Betty Driver (1920–2011), English singer, actress. and author
- Bruce Driver (born 1962), Canadian ice-hockey player
- Charles Henry Driver (1832–1900), British architect
- Craig Driver (born 1988), American baseball coach
- Danny Driver (born 1977), British classical pianist
- Danny Driver (born 1977), American businessman and music producer
- Donald Driver (born 1975), American football player
- Godfrey Rolles Driver (1892–1975), English orientalist
- James G. Driver (1889–1975), American college basketball coach
- Jeremiah Driver (1861–1946), English cricketer
- Jon Driver (1962–2011), British psychologist and neuroscientist
- Jonty Driver (1939–2023), South African anti-apartheid activist, former political prisoner, educationalist, poet and writer
- Kathy Driver, South African mathematician
- Michael B. Driver (1868–1942), American politician
- Minnie Driver (born 1970), English actress and singer
- Moses Driver, Fijian police officer
- Nancy Driver (1933–2009), better known as Nancy Walters, American model, actress, and minister
- Oliver Driver (born 1974), New Zealand actor and director
- Paddy Driver (born 1934), South African motorcyclist and racing driver
- Richard Driver (1829–1880), Australian solicitor, politician, and cricket administrator
- Rod Driver (1932–2022), American mathematician and politician
- Ryan Driver (born 1979), English cricketer
- Samuel Rolles Driver (1846–1914), English biblical scholar
- Sara Driver (born 1945), American filmmaker
- Steph Driver, British political aide
- Toby Driver (born 1978), American avant-garde musician, founder of Kayo Dot
- William Driver (1803–1886), American ship's captain who coined the phrase "Old Glory" for the U.S. flag
- William J. Driver (1873–1948), American politician from Arkansas
- William L. Driver (1883–1941), American football coach for Washburn University, Mississippi, TCU, and UC Davis

== See also ==
- Driver
