= C.O.P. The Recruit =

2009 video game

- European box art
- Developer: VD-dev
- Publisher: Ubisoft
- Designers: Fernando Velez; Guillaume Dubail
- Programmer: Fernando Velez
- Artist: Guillaume Dubail
- Composers: Jason Graves; Dan Schneider; Davide Pensato (dpstudios)
- Platform: Nintendo DS
- Release: NA: 3 November 2009; PAL: 13 November 2009
- Genre: Action-adventure
- Mode: Single-player

C.O.P. The Recruit is a 2009 action-adventure video game developed by VD-dev and published by Ubisoft for the Nintendo DS. It was originally developed as an entry in the Driver series, called Driver: The Recruit, but was retooled into a standalone IP.

== Gameplay ==
C.O.P. The Recruit is a third-person shooter and a driving game set in an open world New York City, with the same map layout and environment as Driver: Parallel Lines (confirming its relation with the Driver series), however due to memory constraints lacking the island of Bronx. The game has around 51 missions with over 20 hours of gameplay. It is possible, using the DS system's microphone (and the in-game PDA), to call the SWAT team, create barricades, road blocks, call an ambulance and access the city's camera system.

== Plot ==
The game follows Dan Miles, a former street racer who becomes a new recruit in the Criminal Overturn Program (C.O.P.). Under the terms of the C.O.P., Dan becomes a detective working to protect the citizens of New York City against large-scale threats. Working with his mentor, Detective Brad Winter, Dan is investigating a series of terrorist attacks in the city when Brad is falsely arrested, putting the investigation on hold. While trying to uncover the truth behind Brad's arrest, Dan goes undercover and returns to his life on the streets. Little by little he gets wrapped up in a deadly, widespread conspiracy and must work to prevent a potentially catastrophic attack on the city.

== Development ==
The game was announced at E3 2009 at the Nintendo conference.

== Reception ==
Reception

Aggregate score
Aggregator	Score
Metacritic	55/100

Review scores
Publication	Score
Eurogamer	4/10
Game Informer	4.25/10
GamePro	3.5/5
GameRevolution	D
GameZone	7.5/10
IGN	5/10
Nintendo Life	7/10
Nintendo Power	4/10
Nintendo World Report	6/10
VideoGamer.com	5/10
Teletext GameCentral	3/10

C.O.P. The Recruit received "mixed or average" reviews according to video game review aggregator Metacritic.

The game won two Best of E3 2009 Awards: Best Action Game and Best Graphics Technology.
