= Driver: San Francisco =

2011 video game

- Cover art featuring protagonist John Tanner and his 1970 Dodge Challenger R/T (bottom)
- Developer: Ubisoft Reflections (Note: Additional work was provided by Ubisoft Annecy, Ubisoft Vancouver, Ubisoft Montreal, Ubisoft Bucharest, Ubisoft Porto Alegre (Wii version), and Ubisoft Kyiv (PC version). Mobile phone version developed by Gameloft)
- Publishers: Ubisoft; Gameloft (mobile phone)
- Directors: Martin Edmondson; Craig Lawson
- Producers: Marie-Jo Leroux; Chris Hadley; Gary Ushaw
- Designers: Jean-Sebastien Decant; Andrew Willans; Dale Scullion
- Programmers: Marie-Ève Danis; Michael Troughton
- Artists: Mike Haynes; Jack Couve
- Writers: Ian Mayor; James Worrall; David Midgley
- Composer: Marc Canham
- Series: Driver
- Platforms: PlayStation 3; Wii; Xbox 360; Microsoft Windows; Mac OS X; Android; Mobile phone
- Release: PS3, Wii, Xbox 360: NA: 30 August 2011; AU: 1 September 2011; EU: 2 September 2011; Microsoft Windows: NA: 27 September 2011; AU: 29 September 2011; EU: 30 September 2011; Mac OS X: WW: 8 March 2012
- Genres: Action-adventure, driving
- Modes: Single-player, multiplayer

Driver: San Francisco is a 2011 action-adventure driving video game developed by Ubisoft Reflections and published by Ubisoft. It is the fifth main installment in the Driver series, following Driver: Parallel Lines (2006), and its most recent main installment to date. Plotwise, it acts as a sequel to Driver 3 (2004) centering around protagonist John Tanner. It was released for PlayStation 3, Xbox 360, Microsoft Windows, and Mac OS X; additionally a distinct version for the Wii features a separate storyline, and a separate version of the game was released for mobile phones and Android devices by Gameloft.

It has players traverse a fictional representation of San Francisco and the Bay Area, conducting missions through the use of licensed real-world cars, with the ability to Shift into any car in the setting in most platform editions. The main story sees players controlling John Tanner, a police detective, who falls into a coma pursuing his nemesis Charles Jericho following a prison breakout after the events of Driver 3 and finds himself piecing together his plan in a dream world while it is happening in real life.

It received favorable reviews upon its release, with the exception of the Wii edition which received mixed reviews. A mini-comic series was released which provides plot details of the events between Driver 3 and San Francisco, with it receiving a collector's edition that includes additional multiplayer vehicles and single-player events.

== Gameplay ==
Gameplay screenshot (Xbox 360 version) depicting the player driving away from cops in a Pontiac Solstice; for the first time in the series, it features licensed cars.

The player can switch to another car, aside from those with an opponent inside of them at any time using the "Shift" ability. (The above screenshot is from a pre-release version.)

Driver: San Francisco features a new ability, Shift, which allows Tanner to teleport from one car to another without discontinuing the mission. One of the inspirations for Shift comes from Google Earth. It was also described as a "return to the roots" of the series as the ability to get out of the car, which was introduced in Driver 2, was removed and replaced with the ability to Shift (teleport) into other cars, as the developers felt that too many games had this kind of feature already and "it wasn't desirable [for us] to just copy that exact mechanic". With Shift, the player can also start or continue missions. As well as the ability to use Shift, all cars are equipped with a 'boost' feature, requiring the player to push up on the left thumbstick to use it. Players can also push L1 on the PlayStation 3 or the left shoulder button on the Xbox 360 version to perform a special 'ram' attack on cars. The film director mode, which was absent from Parallel Lines, also returns, and players can share their videos on the Driver Club website. It runs at 60 frames per second.

San Francisco is unique from other games in the series in that features licensed real-world cars. There are a total 140 fully damageable vehicles based on real-life models, ranging from buggies and compact cars to muscle cars and sport cars. The automobile marques featured in it include Alfa Romeo, AMC, Aston Martin, Audi, Bentley, Cadillac, Chevrolet, DeLorean, Dodge, Ford, GMC, Hummer, Lamborghini, Lincoln, McLaren, Pagani, Ruf, Shelby, and Volkswagen. The protagonist, John Tanner, drives a 1970 Dodge Challenger R/T.

=== Multiplayer ===
Split screen and online multiplayer are also available for the first time in the series with 19 different game modes including Trailblazer, Tag, Sprint GP, Takedown, among others. In Trail Blazer, the players have to follow the trail of an AI-controlled car to accumulate points. The player who accumulates more points will win the match. The Tag game mode is similar to regular tag, but in reverse. All the players are trying to "tag" or hit, one player. Once he is hit, the person who tagged him is now it. The multiplayer will also have experience points. The multiplayer functionality was set to be shut down on September 1, 2022. The date was later delayed to October 1, 2022.

=== Wii version ===
The Wii version it does not include the "Shift" mechanic, but allows players to use guns while driving. The SMG, the pistol, the shotgun, the assault rifle and the RPG are all the weapons available. All weapons can be upgraded in the following categories: clip size, reload speed, and damage. There is a maximum of four levels for each upgrade. Upgrade points can be earned by doing various tricks and earning awards around the city. A new feature for the Wii is the localized multi-player, where a second player may take control of the gun or, if they desire, can connect a Nintendo DS, DSi or 3DS system through download play.

The DS device can be used to make roadblocks, look for police, and buy player 1 some more time through playing various mini games. There is also a four player split-screen multiplayer. The split screen mode includes four game variants. The variants are Capture the flag, in which the players must grab a flag and drive it to a specific location, Pass the Bomb, in which players must pass a bomb from car to car before a timer counts down, ending, Gold Rush, in which the players must grab a bag of money and hold on to it for points, and elimination, in which players must race each other. There is also a cops and robbers split screen mode.

== Plot ==
=== Setting ===
The setting focuses on a fictionalized representation of San Francisco, along with the surrounding regions of Marin County and Oakland, recreating the geography, generalized layout of the city, and notable landmarks including the San Francisco–Oakland Bay Bridge and the Golden Gate Bridge. The recreation features around 208 miles (335 km) of roads, though the amount of roads and territory in the setting is reduced in the Wii edition, as the main bridges of the city are blocked. It takes place six months after the events of Driver 3; a mini-comic series provides background on events during the six-month period. On the other hand, the plot of the Wii version differs from the PS3 and Xbox 360 consoles, Windows and Mac versions; it serves as a prequel to the original Driver.

=== Story ===
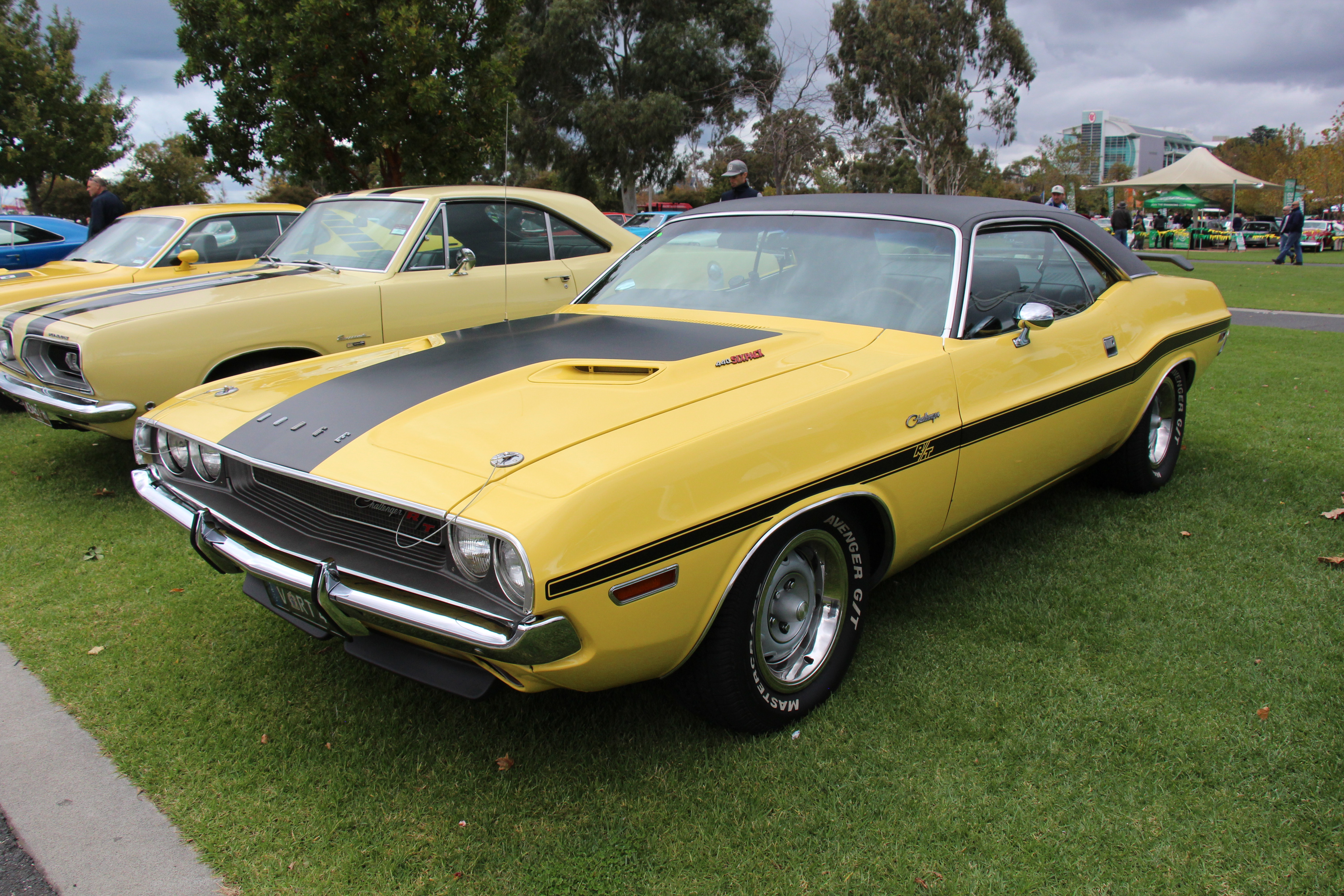
The protagonist, John Tanner, drives a 1970 Dodge Challenger R/T.

After he and FBI agent John Tanner (Demetri Goritsas) undergo successful surgery, criminal Charles Jericho (Michael Dobson) escapes from a Turkish hospital and flees back to the United States. Following this, Tanner and his partner Tobias Jones (Peter Benson) manage to locate and arrest him in San Francisco. On the day of his trial, Jericho stages a breakout from his prison convoy, overpowering his guards and eliminating the police escort. While monitoring the convoy's route, Tanner and Jones witness the breakout and pursue him after he takes control of the prison van. As Jericho ambushes them and attempts to run them down with the van, Tanner escapes into a street with heavy traffic that results in a devastating crash, putting him in a coma.

Moments later, Tanner awakens in his car with Jones, with things seemingly normal; Tanner however finds himself hearing voices in his head regarding an accident. When the pair track down the prison van, Tanner finds himself suddenly disappearing from his car and reappearing in the driver's seat of an ambulance carrying a critically injured patient. To his shock, he learns he is actually inhabiting the body of the ambulance's driver, and is confused by the event. Tanner soon discovers he has an ability that lets him "Shift" into another person's body, taking on their appearance but retaining his own memories and skills. Deciding to use this ability to his advantage, Tanner begins helping people across the city while continuing to investigate Jericho.

Tanner discovers that Jericho intends to construct a chemical bomb, with which he plans to hold the city ransom. Tanner then inhabits the body of a small-time crook to infiltrate the organization, but is immediately discovered by Jericho, who also possesses the ability to Shift. As things around him begin to grow more bizarre, Tanner eventually discovers that he has been in a dream world since the crash, with the events influenced by his subconscious hearing the TV broadcast. As Tanner combats the dream Jericho in order to regain control and end his coma, he realizes that Jericho's plan goes against his character, and suspects that he is plotting something else.

Upon finally awakening from his coma, Tanner informs Jones that Jericho is hoaxing a bomb threat to conceal a major crime. Jones reluctantly trusts his partner, and hands the key to his car, allowing him to go after Jericho. Tanner's deduction proves correct when an explosion that seems chemical is in reality a large-scale smokescreen; Jericho's actual plan was to conceal the breakout of Rufus, another inmate from the prison he was held in, with several other inmates also escaping. Tanner arives and pursues Jericho throughout San Francisco, leading to a confrontation between the two at a warehouse. As Tanner prepares to hit Jericho with a head-on collision, Jones suddenly arrives and rams Jericho from the side, incapacitating him, before suggesting to Tanner that they go for a drink after.

=== Wii version ===
Tanner and his partner Alvarez chase gangster Solomon Caine, but eventually get into a car crash; Alvarez is killed and Tanner goes undercover, where he meets his new partner, Tobias Jones. Tanner gains the trust of Caine and his gang by doing various jobs, including setting two rival gangs up against each other to create a market for military-grade arms. Later, Tanner assists a member of Caine's gang, known as "the Geek", to help steal back confiscated weapons. Tanner's identity is revealed when the Geek recognizes him as the officer who arrested him, and alerts the others, leading to Tanner's capture by the gang.

Meanwhile, Jones and other officers believe Tanner to be dead until they get a tip about his location, and Jones goes to rescue Tanner. To get to Caine, the two interrogate one of his men and a witness about a weapons drop, and they set up a fake drop to arrest Caine. Tanner and Jones then take down a convoy of weapons trucks before they reach their buyers. When they return to the drop, Caine manages to escape but Tanner tracks him down and arrests him. However, Caine's gang break him out after he is taken to the precinct. As Tanner and Jones use a police helicopter to give chase, Caine is finally captured when his own helicopter crashes on Alcatraz Island. Caine is eventually convicted of murder and arms-dealing, and is sentenced to life in prison, but manages to escape to Chicago.

== Development, release, and marketing ==
It was in development for around five years. A new game in the series for the-then upcoming PlayStation 3 was confirmed to be in production at the 2005 Tokyo Game Show when Sony announced a list of 102 games. Ubisoft later confirmed a new game in the series after acquiring the series from Atari. A new Driver game was confirmed to be in development in 2010 and was slated for release in Ubisoft's fiscal year ending in March 2011. Ubisoft registered the domain driversanfranciscogame.com as well as driversanfrancisco.com and driversanfran.com in April 2010, suggesting that San Francisco was the setting of the new game in the series. (Note: Attributed to multiple sources:) Ubisoft officially announced it, titled Driver: San Francisco on their E3 2010 conference. Reflections founder and series creator Martin Edmondson, returned to Reflections after he temporarily left the video game industry in 2004. It was developed by five Ubisoft studios with Reflections as the lead, and four other developers: Vancouver, Kyiv, Shanghai and Montreal. Ubisoft released a free DLC, with 12 new routes for all online modes on 12 September.

The audio was mixed at Pinewood Studios, which is known for the James Bond film franchise. It includes 60 licensed songs, an original score from Marc Canham along with a new version of the Driver theme by Canham. The OST is mixed and produced by Rich Aitken at Nimrod. On 30 August, the soundtrack was confirmed with 76 songs with genres like funk, hip hop, electronic, alternative rock and hard rock from artists such as Aretha Franklin, Dr. John, DJ Shadow, The Black Keys, The Cure, Beastie Boys, Queens of the Stone Age, The Heavy, Unkle, and Elbow. The PlayStation 3 and Xbox 360 versions support custom soundtracks which allows the player to listen to their own music during gameplay. Demetri Goritsas voices the protagonist, John Tanner.

In 2011, Ubisoft confirmed at the time that all of their future games with online functionality would require "Uplay Passport" online pass. Driver: San Francisco was the first in line to utilize this feature. However, due to misprinted codes, which left players who bought new copies are unable to play online, the online pass was waived for the Xbox 360 version. A comic book mini-series published by Wildstorm Productions based on it was released. The storyline takes place after the events of Driver and before San Francisco, and focuses on Tanner's personal vengeance against Jericho: the mini-series was written by David Lapham and illustrated by Greg Scott. The first issue was released in August 2011 and a preview entitled The Pursuit of Nothingness was available at Comic-Con 2010.

A collector's edition was also available for the PlayStation 3, Xbox 360, and Microsoft Windows versions for PAL territories only. The pack includes an 18×9×9 cm replica of a 1970 Dodge Challenger R/T 440 Six Pack, a map of San Francisco detailing the in-game location of the 80 dares scattered across the city, three exclusive in-game cars for multiplayer mode including 1963 Aston Martin DB5, 1972 Lamborghini Miura, and 1966 Shelby Cobra 427, 4 single-player challenges: Mass Chase – a wrongfully accused driver attempts to escape the whole police force of San Francisco and prove his innocence; Relay Race – change car between laps to win race; Russian Hill Racers – race against 3 supercars in the famous district; and Taxi – race against other taxis in Downtown.

Ubisoft had originally reported that Driver: San Francisco would be released in early 2011, but in August 2010 reported that it would be delayed to its next fiscal year. In April 2011, it was confirmed by the company that it would arrive in September 2011, however in August it was confirmed by the company that the release of the Windows version would be delayed by almost a month, being released on 27 September in North America and 30 September in Australia and Europe. It was officially released on 30 August in North America and 2 September in Europe for PlayStation 3, Wii and Xbox 360. In March 2012, it was ported to OS X.

== Reception ==
=== Critical ===
Reception

Aggregate score
Aggregator	Score			
Aggregator	PC	PS3	Wii	Xbox 360
Metacritic	80/100	79/100	64/100	80/100

Review scores
Publication	Score			
Publication	PC	PS3	Wii	Xbox 360
Destructoid	N/A	N/A	N/A	7.5/10
Edge	N/A	8/10	N/A	N/A
Eurogamer	N/A	8/10	N/A	N/A
Game Informer	N/A	8/10	N/A	8/10
GamePro	N/A	4/5	N/A	4/5
GameSpot	N/A	8/10	N/A	8/10
GameTrailers	N/A	N/A	N/A	8.2/10
Giant Bomb	N/A	4/5	N/A	4/5
IGN	8/10	8/10	7/10	8/10
Joystiq	N/A	N/A	N/A	4.5/5
Nintendo Power	N/A	N/A	4.5/10	N/A
Official Xbox Magazine (US)	N/A	N/A	N/A	7.5/10
PC Gamer (UK)	80%	N/A	N/A	N/A
PlayStation: The Official Magazine	N/A	7/10	N/A	N/A
The Daily Telegraph	N/A	N/A	N/A	4/5
The Guardian	N/A	4/5	N/A	N/A

Driver: San Francisco received "generally favorable reviews" on all platforms except the Wii version, which received "mixed" reviews, according to video game review aggregator website Metacritic. In Japan, Famitsu gave the PlayStation 3 and Xbox 360 versions a score of three eights and one nine for a total of 33 out of 40.

The Daily Telegraph gave the Xbox 360 version a score of four stars out of five, saying: "Delivered with wit and panache, Driver San Francisco works because it's daft, rather than in spite of it. And if it proves anything, it's that having conviction in your ideas --any ideas-- can bring a refreshing new twist to an ailing series and genre".

The Guardian gave the PS3 version a similar score of four stars out of five and said: "It's not perfect – the storyline is a bit perfunctory, its free-form style can be illusory when it forces you to perform certain missions and it gets a bit repetitious in the latter stages. But it's a joyous sandbox in which you can drive like a lunatic, in exotic machinery that you might never even clap your eyes on in real life, without hurting anyone".

The Digital Fix gave the same console version seven out of ten, saying that it "isn't always executed perfectly but it is a whole heap of fun and deserves some credit for being genuinely different".

=== Accolades and sales ===
Driver: San Francisco won the Best Driving Game of E3 2010 award from Ripten. It also received a nomination from Kotaku. During E3 2011 it also received a Best Racing Game award from Machinima Inc. and nominations from G4 and Game Critics Awards.

Ubisoft announced in its fall 2011 quarterly financial report that sales of Driver: San Francisco had exceeded their targets. On 9 December 2016, it was delisted from online stores and became unavailable for digital purchase due to license expiring; one online petition is ongoing at Change.org to request Ubisoft to make it available again.
