= Marc Canham (composer) =

British music composer and record producer

- Born: 19 October 1977 (age 48); United Kingdom
- Genres: Orchestral; dark ambient; experimental; electronica; experimental rock
- Occupations: Musician; composer
- Instruments: digital audio workstation; Prophet 5; OP-1
- Years active: 1997–present
- Website: marccanham.com

Marc Canham is a British composer of music for film and video games. In 2008, he scored Far Cry 2, and in 2020, he composed the film score to I Care A Lot, for which he received an ASCAP award. Canham has collaborated with several artists including Iggy Pop, Nathan Johnson, Philip Glass, Baaba Maal, Bryan Mantia, and Paul Hartnoll.

On creating music, Canham stated that he wanted to deliver emotion through a "sound palette" of combinations of sounds, textures, and ensembles of instruments, then letting loose with melodies and motifs. For I Care A Lot, Canham claims to have created the score from the script, as opposed to the film.

== Nimrod Productions ==
Along with Richard Aitken and others, Canham founded Nimrod Productions Limited in 2000, a music production company in Oxfordshire, UK. Nimrod has provided orchestral soundtracks for The Getaway, Black Monday, Gran Turismo 4 and Driver 2, 3 and Driver: San Francisco. It was dissolved in 2019 and succeeded by Nimrod Sound as Rich Aitken’s mix company.

== Nimrod Studio Orchestra ==
Canham founded the Nimrod Studio Orchestra (NSO) in 2002, a commercial session orchestra which has been behind game scores including 24: The Game, Killzone 2, and Act of War: Direct Action.

== Works ==
=== Film scores ===
Year	Title
2009	The Disappearance of Alice Creed (with NSO)
2012	When the Lights Went Out
2015	Burn Burn Burn
2015	Final Girl
2019	Close
2020	I Care a Lot
2021	Barbarians
2022	The Lost Girls

=== Games ===
Year	Title
2002	Stuntman (video game)
2002	Taz: Wanted
2004	Driver 3
2005	Act of War: Direct Action (Collaboration with Jonathan Williams and NSO)
2006	24: The Game (With NSO and Nimrod Productions)
2006	Reservoir Dogs (video game)
2006	Driver: Parallel Lines
2007	Driver 76 (with Andy Gannon and Ed Scroggie)
2008	Far Cry 2
2009	Battlefield Heroes
2009	Killzone 2 (With NSO)
2010	Split/Second
2010	Chime (as music producer / integrator)
2011	Driver: San Francisco
2012	The Secret World
2014	Infamous First Light
2014	Infamous Second Son

=== Installations ===
The Danger Tree, Titanic Museum, Belfast.
