= Driver: L.A. Undercover =

2007 video game

- Developer: Gameloft Montreal
- Publisher: Gameloft
- Series: Driver
- Platforms: BREW, J2ME
- Release: June 30, 2007
- Genre: Action-adventure
- Mode: Single-player

Driver: L.A. Undercover is a mobile game developed by Gameloft Montreal and published by Gameloft. It was released on June 30, 2007. The game is not a part of the main series canon.

== Story ==
The story starts off two years after Driver: Vegas. Tanner surprisingly looks younger and during the two years was a race car driver. 'Chuck' the chief of police reemployed him not because he wants Tanner back but because the HQ wants him back. He goes undercover to take down the Los Angeles Mafia by working his way up the ladder. He starts off by proving himself to Slick E. which then leads Tanner onto his boss Mme Babs which then leads him onto the L.A. Mafia crime boss, Don Lug.

== Gameplay ==
=== Content ===
Most missions are driving-based with some on foot missions. The player is able to drive around the 3D city, tune, repair and put nitrous oxide in their car, shoot whilst driving, shoot on foot and try driving games and bonus content. The missions consist of escaping the police and gangsters, shooting up streets, racing, delivering packages, etc.

=== Characters ===
- Tanner: A former race car driver now working with the police as an undercover cop trying to infiltrate the Los Angeles Mafia.
- Don Luger: Unforgiving and cruel, Don Luger's tactics often rely on brute force. He has risen to the top of Los Angeles' criminal ladder and become a prominent mob boss.
- Agent Chuck: Tanner's police chief training officer. He has been assigned with rehabilitation of Tanner and supervisor.
- Mme Babs: She is the mastermind controlling Hollywood's criminal activities. Matron of one of Hollywood's most prominent brothel, through her patronage she has access to an invaluable amount of information.
- Slick E: A low-time pimp, he knows a lot more than he shows. He's a go-to guy when it comes to getting information on jobs in Hollywood. He is Tanner's initial contact into the Los Angeles crime world.

== Reception ==
Driver L.A. Undercover garnered some positive feedback, with "Gameloft Player Rating" giving it 8.4/10.
