= IronFall: Invasion =

2015 video game

IRONFALL Invasion
- Developer: VD-dev
- Publisher: VD-dev: JP: Agatsuma Entertainment (3DS only)
- Platforms: Nintendo 3DS, Nintendo Switch
- Release: PAL: February 13, 2015; NA: February 26, 2015; JP: October 28, 2015
- Genre: Third-person shooter
- Modes: Single-player, multiplayer

IRONFALL Invasion is a third-person shooter video game developed and published by VD-dev for the Nintendo 3DS. The game was released in Europe and Australia on February 13, 2015 and in North America on February 26, 2015. It was primarily developed in assembly language. The game was VD-dev's first original work, having primarily worked on licensed titles as well as games for Ubisoft and Atari in the past. A Nintendo Switch version was released on November 28th, 2024.

== Development ==
Details on IRONFALL Invasion were first shared on October 17, 2013 by Nintendo Everything. The game was shown as a tech demo on November 4, 2013.

On January 14, 2015, the game was revealed during a Nintendo Direct presentation and was confirmed to be out February 2015 as a free-to-start title for all Nintendo 3DS users, with enhanced support for the New Nintendo 3DS console. The free-to-start version allows players limited access to the multiplayer campaign, whilst only making the first map in the single-player campaign playable until a certain point. The game gives the player the choice to purchase the full version of each campaign independently, or both campaigns collectively.

On September 13 2022, IRONFALL Invasion was officially revealed for Nintendo Switch in collaboration with IGS showcasing HD visuals and new gameplay mechanics. The Nintendo Switch version was released on November 28, 2024 via Nintendo eShop, and unlike the Nintendo 3DS version it is now buy-to-play, and the single player and multiplayer campaigns cannot be purchased independently.

== Reception ==
Reception

Aggregate score
| Aggregator | Score |
|---|---|
| Metacritic | 48/100 |

Review scores
| Publication | Score |
|---|---|
| Nintendo Life | 7/10 |
| Nintendo World Report | 7/10 |
| VideoGamer.com | 3/10 |

Overall, IRONFALL Invasion received average reviews by critics, with an aggregate Metacritic score of 48/100.

In late March 2015, VD-dev announced that the game had been downloaded 300,000 times. Marcel van Duyn of Nintendo Life praised the gameplay and impressive graphics, though they were disappointed by the lack of innovation in the game.

== 3DS homebrew exploit ==
On July 27, 2015, Jordan "Smealum" Rabet, the developer of the Cubic Ninja exploit, announced a new version of the homebrew exploit, with the same features. On July 31, Rabet confirmed that the game the exploit was found in was IronFall: Invasion. On August 11, Nintendo temporarily delisted the game off the Nintendo eShop, as to prevent the exploit from spreading further. Six days later, Rabet released his exploit. On October 13, IRONFALL Invasion returned to the eShop with "Update Data", which prevents the exploit from being used. As of January 15, 2016, the exploit has been patched on system menu 10.4.0-29 which released the same day. When trying to load the game, the system does not allow users to launch the title until the software is updated, forcing users to download the patch, rendering the exploit unusable even if the older version of the game is available.
