= Driver (series) =

Video game series

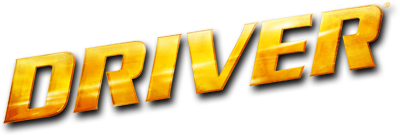
- Genres: Action-adventure, driving
- Developers: Ubisoft Reflections; Sumo Digital
- Publishers: GT Interactive; Infogrames; Ubisoft
- Creator: Martin Edmondson
- Composers: Allister Brimble; Richard Narco; Rich Aitken; Marc Canham; Andy Gannon; Ed Scorggie
- Platforms: PlayStation, Microsoft Windows, Game Boy Color, Classic Mac OS, Game Boy Advance, PlayStation 2, Xbox, Wii, PlayStation Portable, PlayStation 3, Xbox 360, macOS, iOS, Android, Nintendo 3DS
- First release: Driver; 25 June 1999
- Latest release: Driver: Speedboat Paradise; December 2014

Driver is a video game series consisting of a mixture of action-adventure and driving in open world environments. It is developed by Reflections Interactive (now Ubisoft Reflections), and originally published by GT Interactive, later by Infogrames/Atari and then Ubisoft. Since the series began with Driver in 1999, there have been five main installments released of which the latest is Driver: San Francisco in 2011, most of which are about a fictional police officer called John Tanner. As of February 2016, the series has sold more than 20 million units worldwide.

== Games ==
Aggregate review scores
Game	Metacritic
Driver	(PS1) 87 (PC) 79% (Note: GameRankings score) (GBC) 75% (Note: GameRankings score)
Driver 2	(GBA) 73 (PS1) 62
Driver 3	(PS2) 57 (Xbox) 56 (PC) 40 (GBA) 73
Driver: Parallel Lines	(PS2) 69 (Xbox) 69 (PC) 61 (Wii) 59
Driver 76	(PSP) 57
Driver: San Francisco	(PC) 80 (X360) 80 (PS3) 79 (Wii) 64
Driver: Renegade 3D	(3DS) 48

=== Driver ===
The first game of the Driver series was released for the PlayStation on 25 June 1999 in Europe and 30 June in the U.S. It was later released in 2000 for Game Boy Color in April, Windows in September, Mac in December, and iOS in December 2009. In the game, the player controls a former racecar driver turned undercover police detective named John Tanner. It featured a storyline inspired by 1960s/70s car chase movies such as Bullitt (1968) and The Driver (1978) and based in four real-life cities; Miami, San Francisco, Los Angeles and New York City. It was the best selling game of the Driver series and an evolution of the freedom to explore a city as brought forth in the early Grand Theft Auto games.

=== Driver 2 ===
The second installment in the Driver series was released for the PlayStation on 13 November 2000 in the U.S. by Infogrames (now known as Atari), and later ported to the Game Boy Advance on 4 October 2002 in the U.S. It featured detective John Tanner once more, along with a new partner, detective Tobias Jones, in four more real-life cities (Chicago, Havana, Las Vegas, and Rio de Janeiro). It was the first game in the series to feature 2-player modes, curved roads, and the ability to get out of the car at any time (apart from while being in a pursuit from the police) in order to steal another car on the street.

=== Driver 3 ===
The third installment in the Driver series was released for the PlayStation 2 and Xbox on 21 June 2004 in the U.S. to generally mixed or poor reviews (despite new features such as the ability to use firearms). The game takes place in Miami, Nice and Istanbul. It was subsequently followed by versions for Windows, and Game Boy Advance.

=== Driver: Parallel Lines ===
The fourth game in the series, Driver: Parallel Lines, was released 14 March 2006 for PlayStation 2 and Xbox in the U.S., and 26 June 2007 for Windows and Wii in the U.S. Reflections intended Parallel Lines to "return the series to its roots" by focusing more on driving.

The game differs greatly in other aspects from its predecessors, though, as the story no longer follows undercover police officer Tanner and the game takes place in only one location, New York City. The new main player's name is TK, a criminal rather than a cop. The game includes two time periods, 1978 and 2006, when the main player is sentenced to prison for 28 years and returns in 2006. The game received better reviews, but unlike Driver 3, did not sell particularly well.

=== Driver 76 ===
Driver 76 is a PlayStation Portable game in the Driver series. Set in New York City in 1976, two years before the events in the first half of Driver: Parallel Lines, the player takes the role of Ray, TK's friend and a supporting character from Parallel Lines. The game was developed by Sumo Digital and Reflections, and was the first Driver game published by Ubisoft after they acquired Reflections. It was released on 8 May 2007 in the U.S.

=== Driver: San Francisco ===
The fifth Driver game was long rumored to be in production. After several years of speculation, Ubisoft unveiled Driver: San Francisco at E3 2010. After several delays, it was released in September 2011 along with Driver: Renegade 3D.

The game takes place in one location, San Francisco, and follows the series protagonist, Tanner, being in a coma after suffering an accident. Thus, the player controls Tanner during his coma dream. The plot of the Wii version of Driver: San Francisco is completely different from the other versions, being a prequel to the events of the original Driver.

For the game, developers decided to remove the ability to get out of a car in order to steal another car on the street. Instead, they created a new mechanic called "Shift", enabling the players to shift to any car at any time, aside from a few missions.

The game received generally positive reviews, getting the highest ratings in the whole series after Driver. Like Driver 3, it sold particularly well.

=== Driver: Renegade 3D ===
A Nintendo 3DS game, Driver: Renegade 3D follows John Tanner trying to take down the New York City crime mobs. It was released in September 2011 at the same time as Driver: San Francisco and takes place between the events of Driver and Driver 2.

=== Driver: Speedboat Paradise ===
A free-to-play smartphone game was released on iOS and Android in December 2014. The game, which makes use of in-app purchases, revolves solely around missions on speedboats.

== Novels ==
Driver: Nemesis, a novel written by Alex Sharp, was published in 2010 to coincide with the release of Driver: San Francisco. The novel is a sequel to Driver 2 and a prequel to the events of Driver: San Francisco, taking place at some point before Hurricane Katrina. The story follows John Tanner's undercover infiltration to a crime network in New Orleans. It features several characters from the first two games and provides additional backstory for Tanner's life prior to becoming a member of law enforcement.

== Related games ==
Driver: Vegas (released in 2005) and Driver: L.A. Undercover (released in 2007) are two mobile games featuring John Tanner. Vegas features his exploits in Las Vegas in an attempt to exact revenge on Charles Jericho after Driver 3, while L.A. Undercover, set two years later, features Tanner's exploits in Los Angeles to take down the Los Angeles Mafia by working his way up the ladder.

=== C.O.P. The Recruit ===
Ubisoft released C.O.P. The Recruit for Nintendo DS on 3 November 2009. It was originally registered under numerous names, one of which being "Driver: The Recruit".

=== Watch Dogs ===
Ubisoft Montreal had been working on its own sequel in the Driver series at the same time that Ubisoft Reflections had been developing Driver: San Francisco. Ubisoft Montreal's game had included some elements of hacking the driving environment to the player advantage, such as triggering street lights, as well as being able to swap from driver to driver. When Driver: San Francisco released in 2011, it did not do well commercially, leading to the Driver title in development at Ubisoft Montreal to have portions reworked into the first Watch Dogs game. Ubisoft Reflections subsequently helped Ubisoft Montreal in building out Watch Dogs for release, handling most of the driving portions of the game while Ubisoft Montreal handled the details related to on-foot missions and hacking. The game's Disrupt engine was originally intended for this Driver game in development.

== Film and television adaptations ==
In February 2002, Impact Pictures, the production team of Paul W. S. Anderson and Jeremy Bolt, had acquired the film and TV rights to adapt Driver. Screenwriters James DeMonaco, Todd Jason Harthan, and James Roday Rodriguez were developing a script at the time. Impact Pictures had originally intended to produce the film Driver to coincide with the release of the video game Driver 3. The following November, Impact Pictures announced its plans to produce a $50 million adaptation of Driver after wrapping up principal photography on Resident Evil: Apocalypse. In April 2006, Rogue Pictures acquired the film rights to Driver from Impact Pictures and Constantin Films, the production companies responsible for the Resident Evil film franchise. Roger Avary replaced the original screenwriters in writing the script for Driver, as well as directing the film.

Prior to January 2007, Driver, having a budget of $48 million, was slated to shoot at Cinespace Studios' MT28 lot in Toronto, Ontario, Canada. Due to a waterfront revitalization project, the studio was forced to move and the film was put on hold. In May 2009, the movie script was leaked on the internet.

On 14 September 2021, Ubisoft announced a live-action Driver series was coming to the new Binge streaming platform, to be produced by Allan Ungar, Vince Talenti and Ubisoft Film & Television. It was cancelled shortly after.
