= VD-dev =

French video game developer

- Formerly: Digital Concept; Velez & Dubail Dev. Team
- Type: Private
- Industry: Video games
- Founded: 1990
- Founder: Fernando Velez; Guillaume Dubail
- Headquarters: France
- Website: vd-dev.com

VD-dev (formerly Digital Concept and Velez & Dubail Dev. Team) is a French video game development studio founded in 1990. It was closely affiliated with Atari and Ubisoft, working on games commissioned by them before stepping into independent game development.

== History ==
The studio was founded by the programmer Fernando Velez and the graphic designer Guillaume Dubail, with both working on game design. After abandoning a shoot 'em up concept in 1989, they developed Jim Power in Mutant Planet under the name Digital Concept. They parted ways between 1992 and 1996 (Guillaume Dubail worked on Jim Power's graphics while Fernando Velez programmed Mr. Nutz and Jurassic Park Part 2: The Chaos Continues for Game Boy). They were credited under their names beginning in 1996, then as Velez & Dubail Dev. Team from 2002 (V-Rally 3) and eventually as VD-dev from 2007. In 2013, they were reunited by Frédéric Zimmer, animation programmer for Ubisoft's Watch Dogs. Fernando Velez died in July 2016 at the age of 46.

== Games developed ==
Year	Title	Platform(s)	Publisher(s)
1992	Jim Power in Mutant Planet	Amiga	Loriciel
1996	The Smurfs Travel the World	Game Boy, Game Gear, Master System	Infogrames Multimedia
1996	Lucky Luke	Game Boy	Infogrames Multimedia
1997	The Smurfs' Nightmare	Game Boy	Infogrames Multimedia
1998	V-Rally Championship Edition	Game Boy	Infogrames Multimedia (Ocean)
1998	The Smurfs' Nightmare	Game Boy Color	Infogrames
1999	V-Rally Championship Edition	Game Boy Color	Infogrames
1999	Bugs Bunny & Lola Bunny: Operation Carrot Patch	Game Boy Color	Infogrames
2000	Le Mans 24 Hours	Game Boy Color	Infogrames
2000	Wacky Races	Game Boy Color	Infogrames
2000	Supercross Freestyle	Game Boy Color	Infogrames
2002	V-Rally 3	Game Boy Advance	Infogrames
2003	Stuntman	Game Boy Advance	Infogrames
2004	Asterix & Obelix XXL	Game Boy Advance	Atari
2005	Driver 3	Game Boy Advance	Atari
2009	C.O.P. The Recruit	Nintendo DS	Ubisoft
2011	Driver: Renegade 3D	Nintendo 3DS	Ubisoft
2015	IronFall: Invasion	Nintendo 3DS, Nintendo Switch	Self-published
2018	RISE: Race the Future	Microsoft Windows, Nintendo Switch, Android, iOS	Self-published
