= Drive =

Drive may refer to:

== Arts, entertainment, and media ==
=== Films ===
- Drive (1997 film), an action film starring Mark Dacascos
- Drive, a 2002 Japanese film starring Ren Osugi
- Drive (2011 film), an American crime drama starring Ryan Gosling
- Drive (2019 film), an Indian romantic drama
- Drive (2023 film), a South Korean action crime mystery thriller
- Drive (2025 film), an Indian Telugu-language thriller

=== Literature ===
- Drive: The Story of My Life, an autobiography by Larry Bird
- Drive: The Surprising Truth About What Motivates Us, a 2009 book by Daniel H. Pink
- Drive (novel), 2005, by James Sallis

=== Music ===
==== Albums ====
- Drive (Alan Jackson album) or the title song (see below), 2002
- Drive (Anneke van Giersbergen album) or the title song, 2013
- Drive (Béla Fleck album), 1988
- Drive (Bic Runga album) or the title song, 1997
- Drive (Gareth Emery album), 2014
- Drive (Poisonblack album), 2011
- Drive (Robert Palmer album), 2003
- Drive (Russ Freeman album) or the title song, 2002
- Drive (Steve Wariner album) or the title song, 1993
- Drive (Tiësto album), 2023
- Drive: Glay Complete Best, by Glay, 2000
- Drive: Nike + Original Run, by the Crystal Method, 2006
- The Drive (album), by Haddaway, 1995
- Drives (album), by Lonnie Smith, 1970
- Drive, by Roy Ayers, 1988
- Drive, by Stephen Ashbrook, 2001

==== EPs ====
- Drive (Amerie EP), 2016
- Drive (Bic Runga EP) or the title song, 1995
- Drive (Scott Grimes EP), 2010

==== Songs ====
- "Drive" (Black Coffee and David Guetta song), 2018
- "Drive" (The Cars song), 1984
- "Drive" (Clean Bandit and Topic song), 2021
- "Drive" (Client song), 2007
- "Drive" (Incubus song), 2000
- "Drive" (Cheyenne Jackson song), 2012
- "Drive" (Cory Marks song), 2020
- "Drive" (Miyeon song), 2022
- "Drive" (Shannon Noll song), 2004
- "Drive" (Ed Sheeran song), 2025
- "Drive" (SZA song), 2024
- "Drive" (R.E.M. song), 1992
- "Drive" (Gretta Ray song), 2016
- "Drive (For Daddy Gene)", Alan Jackson, 2002
- "Drive", by Alessia Cara from Love & Hyperbole, 2025
- "Drive", by Ashton Irwin from Superbloom, 2020
- "Drive", by Audrey Hobert from Who's the Clown?, 2025
- "Drive", by Ben Rector from Magic, 2018
- "Drive", by Bobby McFerrin from Don't Worry, Be Happy, 1988
- "Drive", by Brett Kissel from The Compass Project, 2023
- "Drive", by Carly Rae Jepsen from Kiss, 2012
- "Drive", by the Chevin from Borderland, 2012
- "Drive", by Chung Ha from Blooming Blue, 2018
- "Drive", by Cold Chisel from Blood Moon, 2019
- "Drive", by Daft Punk, 2011
- "Drive", by the Gaslight Anthem from Sink or Swim, 2007
- "Drive", by Geoffrey Williams, 1996
- "Drive", by Halsey from Badlands, 2015
- "Drive", by Imagine Dragons from Imagine Dragons, 2009
- "Drive", by Joe 90 from Dream This, 1999
- "Drive", by the Matches from Decomposer, 2006
- "Drive", by Miley Cyrus from Bangerz, 2013
- "Drive", by Nate Haller, 2024
- "Drive", by NCT Dream from Glitch Mode, 2022
- "Drive", by Pale Waves from My Mind Makes Noises, 2018
- "Drive", by Pepper from Pink Crustaceans and Good Vibrations, 2008
- "Drive", by Shinee from The Story of Light, 2018
- "Drive", by Shortfall from the Squirtgun Records compilation More of Our Stupid Noise, 1998
- "Drive", by Stray Kids from SKZ-Replay, 2022
- "Drive", by Tonight Alive from Limitless, 2016
- "Drive", by Travis Scott from Owl Pharaoh, 2013
- "Drive", by U-Turn featuring Richard Poon, 2005
- "Drive", by Vanessa Hudgens from V, 2006
- "Drive", by The Weeknd from Hurry Up Tomorrow, 2025
- "Drive", by X Ambassadors from Townies, 2024
- "Drive", by Yanni from Sensuous Chill, 2016
- "Drive", by Younha from RescuE, 2017
- "Drive (For All Time)", by Westlife from World of Our Own, 2001

==== Other uses in music ====
- Drive (band), an American heavy metal band
- Overdrive, a.k.a. distortion, an audio effect

=== Radio ===
- Drive (CBC Music), the afternoon program on the CBC Music radio network
- WDRV (The Drive, 97.1 FM), a Chicago classic rock station
- WFLB, a station licensed to Laurinburg, North Carolina, US and called The Drive from 2005 to 2011
- WNMB, a station licensed to North Myrtle Beach, South Carolina, US and called The Drive since 2018
- WVSC (FM) (103.1 The Drive), a South Carolina classic hits station

=== Television ===
==== Series ====
- Drive (2007 TV series), a 2007 American action drama
- Drive (2016 TV series), a 2016 British reality series
- Kamen Rider Drive, a 2014–2015 tokusatsu series
- The Drive (TV series), an American documentary series on sports in the Pac-12 Conference

==== Episodes ====
- "Drive" (Entourage), 2009
- "Drive" (NCIS: Los Angeles), 2013
- "Drive" (Star Trek: Voyager), 2000
- "Drive" (The X-Files), 1998

=== Other uses in arts and media ===
- The Drive (Thomson), a 1916–1917 painting by Tom Thomson
- Drive: the scifi comic, a webcomic by Dave Kellett
- Drive (studio), a Japanese animation and music studio

== Places ==
- Commercial Drive or "The Drive", a street / neighbourhood in Vancouver
- Drive Creek (Ontario), Canada
- Drive Lake (Ontario), Canada
- Lake Shore Drive or "The Drive", an expressway in Chicago

== Science ==
- Drive theory, a diverse set of motivational theories in psychology
- Drive reduction theory (learning theory), a theory of learning and motivation
- Prey drive, in the study of animal behavior, the predictable tendency of a carnivore to pursue and capture prey
- Gene drive, in genetics, a type of bias in the inheritance of a gene

== Sports ==
- Drive (American football), a continuous set of offensive plays
- The Drive (American football), an offensive series in the January 1987 AFC Championship Game
- Drive (cricket), a straight-batted shot
- Drive (golf), a long-distance shot from the tee
- Drive (tennis), a fast, low groundstroke hit to the opponent's backcourt
- Drive shot (pickleball), a fast, low groundstroke hit to the opponent's backcourt
- Grand Rapids Drive, basketball team
- Greenville Drive, baseball team
- Line drive, a batted ball in baseball that flies relatively straight and low

== Transportation ==
- Drive, street name qualifier
- Driveway, a.k.a. drive, a private road for local access to structures
- Driving, the act of controlling a vehicle

== Technology ==
- Drive, a computer data storage device or logical unit
  - Disk drive, a data storage device that stores data on the surface of one or more disk-shaped media that rotate during operation
    - Floppy disk drive, uses a flexible, removable disk-shaped medium
    - Hard disk drive, uses a rigid, non-removable, disk-shaped medium
  - Google Drive, a file service provided by Google
  - Solid-state drive, a solid-state data storage device
- Drive, a spacecraft propulsion device
- Drive, an automobile transmission device
- Drive, in a motor controller, an electronic device providing power to a motor or servo
- Variable-frequency drive, a type of adjustable-speed drive
- List of screw drives, types of screwdrivers

== Other uses ==
- Drive (charity), a campaign to collect items, usually other than money

== See also ==
- Driver (disambiguation)
- Drove (disambiguation)
- Motivation, a meaning of drive meaning a person's mindset to achieve a goal
- Need for achievement, a meaning of drive meaning a person's mindset to achieve a goal
- Road, a meaning of drive that is an identifiable thoroughfare, route, way, or path between two places
- Road trip, similar to a meaning of drive that is a journey taken by car
- Screwdriver, a tool for turning a screw
