= Wacky Races (2000 video game) =

- Developers: Appaloosa Interactive (Win, PS); Velez & Dubail (GBC)
- Publisher: Infogrames (Note: Published in Japan by Hudson Soft.)
- Platforms: Game Boy Color, Windows, PlayStation
- Release: Game Boy Color: NA: June 6, 2000; EU: June 30, 2000; AU: October 30, 2000; Windows: UK: September 15, 2000; NA: January 15, 2001; PlayStation: UK: September 15, 2000
- Genre: Racing
- Modes: Single-player, multiplayer

Wacky Races is a racing video game developed by Appaloosa Interactive for Windows and PlayStation and by Velez & Dubail for the Game Boy Color. It was published by Infogrames in 2000.

The games use the story and characters from the American series Wacky Races, created by William Hanna and Joseph Barbera. The eleven racing cars compete against each other across circuits inspired by the cartoon characters.

== Gameplay ==
The game features eight ready-to-play vehicles and an additional three boss vehicles that must be unlocked. The eight regular vehicles (and their drivers) are the Buzz Wagon (Rufus Ruffcut and Saw Tooth), the Boulder-Mobile (the Slag Brothers), the Arkansas Chugga-Bug (Lazy Luke and Blubber Bear), the Compact Pussycat (Penelope Pitstop), the Bullet Proof Bomb (the Ant Hill Mob), the Turbo Terrific (Peter Perfect), the Creepy Coupe (the Gruesome Twosome), and the Army Surplus Special (Sergeant Blast and Private Meekly). The three boss vehicles and their drivers are the Crimson Haybailer (Red Max), the Convert-A-Car (Professor Pat Pending), and the Mean Machine (Dick Dastardly and Muttley).

Each vehicle has its own characteristics, strengths, and weaknesses, resulting in a wide variety of driving styles. For example, the Army Surplus Special has low acceleration but a high top speed. The Arkansas Chugga-bug, meanwhile, has a moderate top speed but very good handling.

As in Mario Kart, each competitor has abilities and weapons to fight their way to first place (such as bubble gum, exploding pumpkins, and land mines). The player must accumulate floating pink coins, called Wacky Tokens, scattered around the tracks in order to use their vehicle's specific abilities. These abilities are divided into three categories: defense, speed, and attack.

At the end of the championship mode for the first time, the player has access to the Mean Machine, driven by Dick Dastardly and Muttley, with superior gadgets.

The game has four game modes: Time Trial, Championship, Multiplayer, and Super Gadgets. The latter offers a detailed list of all the gadgets available in the game.

== Reception ==
Reception

Aggregate scores
Aggregator	Score		
Aggregator	GBC	PC	PS
GameRankings	78%	51%	32%
Metacritic	N/A	64/100	N/A

Review scores
Publication	Score		
Publication	GBC	PC	PS
AllGame	4/5	N/A	N/A
Famitsu	N/A	N/A	21/40
GameSpot	8.6/10	N/A	N/A
IGN	8/10	6.2/10	N/A
Jeuxvideo.com	16/20	N/A	N/A
Nintendo Power	7.2/10	N/A	N/A
PlayStation Official Magazine – UK	N/A	N/A	4/10
PC Zone	N/A	50%	N/A

The PC version received "mixed" reviews according to the review aggregation website Metacritic. In Japan, where the PlayStation version was ported for release under the name Chiki Chiki Machine Mō Race (チキチキマシン猛レース, Chiki Chiki Mashin Mō Rēsu) on July 26, 2001, followed by the Game Boy Color version on November 22, 2001, Famitsu gave the former a score of 21 out of 40.
