= The Driver =

1978 film by Walter Hill

- Theatrical release poster
- Directed by: Walter Hill
- Written by: Walter Hill
- Produced by: Lawrence Gordon
- Starring: Ryan O'Neal; Bruce Dern; Isabelle Adjani; Ronee Blakley
- Cinematography: Philip H. Lathrop
- Edited by: Tina Hirsch; Robert K. Lambert
- Music by: Michael Small
- Production company: EMI Films
- Distributed by: 20th Century Fox (United States and Canada); EMI Films (International)
- Release date: July 28, 1978
- Running time: 91 minutes
- Country: United States
- Language: English
- Budget: $4 million
- Box office: $4.9 million

The Driver is a 1978 American neo-noir crime thriller film written and directed by Walter Hill, and starring Ryan O'Neal, Bruce Dern and Isabelle Adjani. The film features only unnamed characters, and follows a getaway driver for robberies (O'Neal) whose exceptional talent has prevented him being caught. A detective determined to apprehend him (Dern) promises pardons to a gang if they help catch him in a set-up robbery.

20th Century Fox released The Driver on July 28, 1978. The film was a box office disappointment in the United States but performed better overseas. Despite initial negative reviews it has become one of Hill's most popular films, and received more positive critical reception and a cult following in later years. Directors Quentin Tarantino, Nicolas Winding Refn and Edgar Wright have all cited its influence.

== Plot ==
The Driver steals cars for use as getaway vehicles in robberies around Los Angeles. He is known among criminals for his high skill and his high price, and is notorious among the police, particularly for The Detective who is obsessed with capturing The Driver whom he calls "Cowboy".

The Driver pulls a job at a casino where his co-conspirators are late and he is seen by The Player. The Detective asks her to identify The Driver, but she denies seeing him. The Driver comes to The Player's apartment to pay her. They are interrupted by The Detective, who threatens The Player and alludes to her criminal history.

The Detective sets up an illegal sting. He offers three arrested criminals – Glasses, Teeth and their driver, Fingers – a deal: hire The Driver for a bank heist and deliver him to the police; in return, they will go free. They seek The Driver via The Connection, his middleman and fence. The Driver initially refuses to work with the men due to his dislike of guns, but agrees to meet with them. When his driving skill is questioned, he systematically wrecks the criminals' car in a display of his prowess, and tells the gang he will not work with them. Later, Teeth visits The Driver to ask him again to join them, eventually threatening him with a gun. The Driver challenges Teeth to shoot, before beating him down. The Detective taunts The Driver at his rented room and challenges him to a 'game'. Despite being aware it is a set up, The Driver agrees to take part in the job on the conditions that his fee is doubled and Teeth is not involved.

During the heist, Glasses kills Fingers and escapes with The Driver. He does not deliver The Driver to The Detective, instead planning to kill him and make off with the money. The Driver surprises him with a gun, kills him, and stashes the money in a locker at Union Station. He has The Connection launder the dirty money and enlists The Player to retrieve it once clean. Meanwhile, Teeth has discovered Glasses dead and interrogates The Connection at gunpoint, killing her once she has revealed The Driver's plans.

At the train station, The Exchange Man stashes the clean money in a locker, then boards a train with the dirty money. He is followed on board by The Detective, who kills him in a shootout. Teeth robs The Player of her purse containing the key to the clean money locker. Teeth and his driver, The Kid, are pursued by The Driver and The Player in a car chase culminating in a warehouse, where The Driver drives directly at Teeth's car, causing them to swerve and flip the car. The Driver kills Teeth when he refuses to surrender. The Kid returns the purse and is allowed to leave.

The Driver and The Player return to the train station. When The Driver retrieves the bag from the locker, The Detective and several police officers appear, but the bag is empty, the money having been ripped off by the Exchange Man. The Player leaves. The Driver leaves The Detective literally 'holding the bag' as each person departs.

== Cast ==
None of the characters in the film is identified by name.

- Ryan O'Neal as The Driver
- Bruce Dern as The Detective
- Isabelle Adjani as The Player
- Ronee Blakley as The Connection
- Matt Clark as Red Plainclothesman
- Felice Orlandi as Gold Plainclothesman
- Joseph Walsh as Glasses
- Rudy Ramos as Teeth
- Denny Macko as Exchange Man
- Frank Bruno as The Kid
- Will Walker as Fingers
- Sandy Brown Wyeth as Split
- Tara King as Frizzy
- Richard Carey as Floorman
- Fidel Corona as Card Player
- Victor Gilmour as Boardman
- Nick Dimitri as Blue Mask
- Bob Minor as Green Mask
- Peter Jason as Commuter
- Allan Graf as Uniformed Cop

== Production ==
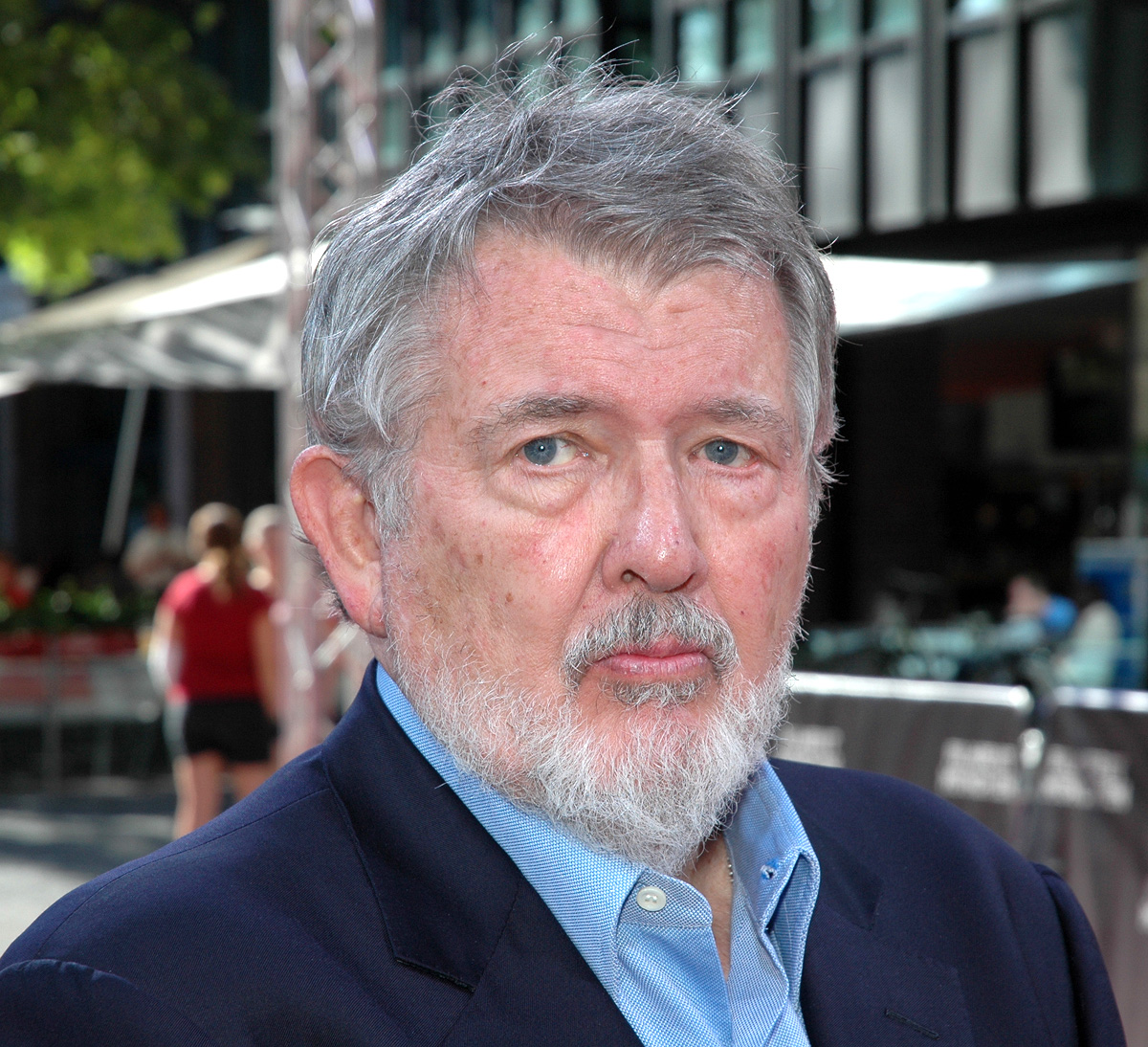
Walter Hill, pictured in 2014.

=== Development ===
The Driver is the second film Walter Hill wrote and directed after Hard Times (1975), which starred Charles Bronson. Hill and producer Larry Gordon had just finished Hard Times when Gordon suggested to Hill that they make a film about a getaway driver, to which Hill agreed. Hill then wrote an original screenplay over the summer of 1975, in between the period when Hard Times was made and when it was released (there was a delay because the studio was waiting for other Bronson films to come out).

Hill says he was interested to see how "pure" a film he could make: a genre film that did not conform itself in conventional, Hollywood ways. He said he wrote it as a "very tight script." "I knew when I was getting ready to do the movie that I was taking a chance", said Hill. "This was not meant to be an everyday action movie. I was trying to do something a little more, or a little less, but I was trying to do something else." The script was written in a sparse, minimalist style, which Hill had first employed on Hard Times: "I thought that approach made people read with greater intention. It's spare in detail but written to dramatic effect. You could maybe capture the mind of the reader a little better." Hill sent a copy of the original draft of the script to director Raoul Walsh, who gave it his approval.

=== Pre-production and casting ===
In the late 1970s, Britain's EMI Films came under the stewardship of Michael Deeley and Barry Spikings. They began co-financing movies shot in Hollywood in association with major US studios that were aimed at the international market, such as Convoy, The Deer Hunter and The Driver. They were interested in financing The Driver provided a suitable star could be found for the lead.

According to Hill, the script was unable to bring in talents for "about a year and a half." The role of the Driver was originally intended for Steve McQueen, who had starred in the Hill-scripted The Getaway (1972). McQueen turned down the role because, as Hill stated, he refused to star in another film that revolved substantially around cars. The studio then went to Bronson, but he was unhappy with Hill. "He thought I had edited Hard Times in a way that had not favoured [Bronson's wife and co-star] Jill Ireland", said Hill, who added he "never thought" casting Bronson "was a good idea. And I never thought he'd do it." Hill was contacted by Ryan O'Neal's agent and agreed to meet the star. "We talked about the role and talked about the minimalist approach I wanted to try", said Hill. "He felt he could do it and we just got comfortable with each other." Although considered primarily a comedy and romantic star at the time, O'Neal's casting enabled the filmmakers to secure financing. O'Neal complimented the filmmaker as "a force to be reckoned with", as well as "a first rate writer and an even better director. And he's fast. Most young directors today think they are David Lean; they spend over a year on a film and we get robots that talk."

Several actors were considered for the female lead, including Julie Christie and Charlotte Rampling. Eventually, it went to Isabelle Adjani, who had gained an international reputation with The Story of Adele H (1975). This was Adjani's first Hollywood role; she had previously turned down the chance to star in The Other Side of Midnight (1977), but agreed to make The Driver because she was an admirer of Hard Times. Of Hill, Adjani commented:

I think he is wonderful, very much in the tradition of Howard Hawks, lean and spare. The story is contemporary but also very stylized, and the roles that Ryan and I play are like Bogart and Bacall. We are both gamblers in our souls and we do not show our emotions or say a lot. For us, talk is cheap. I am really quite a mysterious girl in this film, with no name and no background. And I must say that it is restful not to have a life behind me; this way, I don't have to dig deep to play the part. All I know is that life for me is gambling and I am a loser. I have what people call a poker face.

The studio recommended Robert Mitchum for the role of the Detective. Hill liked the idea and met with Mitchum to discuss the part but the actor turned it down. Hill ended up casting Bruce Dern. "I wanted Bruce's personality", he said. "Audiences get nervous about movies that don't have a lot of dialogue. [...] They like a balance. I wanted Bruce to very much offset the distance of The Driver."

=== Filming ===
Principal photography took place entirely on-location in Los Angeles.

The film featured several car chase sequences designed by Hill and stunt coordinator Everett Creach. Hill says he felt the first chase was "kind of a failure" because it "was meant to lead up to a much more spectacular finish" but he was unable to film it properly: it was done on the last night of shooting and an electrician fell off the roof and was badly injured; Hill could not get all the shots he wanted and had to "cobble together" the result. However, he felt the sequence with the Mercedes 250 S in the garage and the final chase were "as fully realised as I could get them to be." Hill wanted to film chase scenes at night, which he felt had not been done many times in films before. In order to expedite this, Hill shot the dramatic scenes first during the day, then the chase scenes at night. Hill said the night shooting was draining: "It's like you're swimming underwater or hypnotised. And I'm a person that stays up late and wakes up early. But staying up night after night after night really threw me out. You make decisions you cannot explain. You just intuit."

Hill says the major visual influence on the film was the works of artist Edward Hopper. He was also influenced by his work as a second assistant director on Bullitt (1968), which featured a famous car chase. What fascinated Hill on Bullitt was the abundance of shots captured from inside the cars, which compelled him to film the same amount on The Driver. Production wrapped on the film April 1978.

== Box office ==
The movie was a commercial disappointment in the United States although it performed better overseas. Hill says "I don't think you could say the film did commercially well anywhere except Japan, where I believe it did reasonable business."

The film opened in 642 theatres in the United States, grossing $2 million for the weekend.

The film grossed a total of 1,102,183 admissions in France. It was the 33rd most popular film of the year.

EMI Films had announced plans to make another film with Hill, a Western called The Last Gun, but this did not happen.

== Critical reception ==
=== Initial reviews ===
Contemporary reviews were extremely poor. Hill later said, "I remember the studio had this huge sheaf of Xeroxed reviews they’d handed me—you could stop a fucking .45 slug with this stack, it was so thick. And of all the reviews in this six-inch thick pile, there was only one good one."

Kevin Thomas of the Los Angeles Times called the film "ultraviolent trash that wipes out Ryan O'Neal, Bruce Dern and Isabella [sic] Adjani ... plays like a bad imitation of a French gangster picture which in turn is a bad imitation of an American gangster picture." Vincent Canby of the New York Times wrote "It is Awful Movie. It is Pretentious Movie. It is Silly Movie. It talks just like this." Roger Ebert of the Chicago Sun-Times gave The Driver 2.5 stars out of 4, writing, "It's a movie about people who are not real because they are symbols, and it's a damned good thing there are great chase scenes or the movie would sink altogether." Hege. of Variety said it may be the first film where the star of the show is a sound effect and called it a "bleak wreck of a film" and that "because of the quiet and mysterious mood of this picture, it has a pretentious quality to it" although they noted that the car chases are fabulous.

Saying it's "probably advisable for film noir aficionados only", film critic Duncan Shepherd of the San Diego Reader gave it five out of five stars. "The whole show, in fact, is something like a coded message passed from the moviemaker to the devotees of the genre, in full view of, but beyond the full understanding of, the rest of the audience", according to Shepherd.

=== Cast and crew response ===
Producer Larry Gordon later reflected on the film's poor critical and box office response in the US:

If we'd had Clint Eastwood in the film, we'd have been forgiven everything and they'd have said, 'It's another Eastwood film about driving cars'." If we'd had Steve McQueen, we'd have been compared to Bullitt or The Getaway. We were treated as an art film rather than an action film. We took a unique approach to standard material. We'd go the same way again, but with a different cast we might have attracted an audience. I believe in returning investors' money – and if I could make The Driver again I'd try to rectify it for a commercial market. When you're writing this kind of script ... naturally you think of an action lead like [Charles] Bronson or Eastwood ... and certainly Fox wanted a name. But when we got Ryan, I suggested we make changes to suit his character. This is always the director's prerogative.

Ryan O'Neal mentioned The Driver as one of the films he regretted doing.

Isabelle Adjani later complained she felt the film hurt her career. "Afterwards the only American offers I got were bad ones", she said. "I did it, really because after The Story of Adele H everyone urged me to make a Hollywood film. I turned down several, and felt I couldn't continue to do that. And I liked Walter Hill. Only later did I realize I'd made a terrible mistake."

Walter Hill recalled, "Had I not been shooting The Warriors at the time, I don't think my career would have survived. They loved it overseas, but in those days, that didn't matter that much. It made exactly zero dollars in the United States.

"I think Ryan gave a very good performance", added Hill. "I was always very happy with what he did." He said, "I was very disappointed that people didn't particularly give him any credit for what he did. To me, he's the best he's ever been. I cannot imagine another actor. When you don't get who you want, sometimes you really do get lucky."

=== Reappraisal ===
In the decades since its release, The Driver has undergone a critical reappraisal, and is now considered one of Hill's best films, often the first film shown during retrospectives of Hill's work.

In a 2022 review, Peter Bradshaw of The Guardian gave the film 5 out of 5 stars, writing "This is a thoroughly watchable, hardboiled, thrillingly cynical and ruthless drama and Dern’s flinching, beta-male face – in contrast to O’Neal’s tough purity – is a joy."

Mitchell Beaupre of Paste called it, "a film that exists in the bleary hours between dusk and dawn, with Hill emphasizing shot economy and patience in his visual storytelling while his characters trade barbed-wire, matter-of-fact dialogue."

Joe Flockhart of Loud and Clear Reviews writes "The Driver, reviled at release but now regarded as a classic, offers a cold and unsentimental genre film, complete with excellent stunt work."

Eddie Harrison of Film Authority said "Hill’s realistic, tarmac-hugging approach to the action was out of touch with the high-flying stunt-driven action of the period, but the film has endured due to the labyrinthine plotting and the sweaty, physical intensity of the LA locations."

As of March 2026, the film holds an approval rating of 80% on Rotten Tomatoes based on 30 reviews. The site's consensus states: "A tough, highly stylized thriller with amazing sound design and car chases." Metacritic, which uses a weighted average, assigned the film a score of 56 out of 100, based on 13 critics, indicating "mixed or average" reviews.

== Legacy ==
The Reflections Interactive video game Driver (1999) uses several thematic inspirations from this movie. Similarly, a later game in the series, Driver: Parallel Lines (2006) takes place initially in 1978, the same year as the movie.

Both Quentin Tarantino's Pulp Fiction (1994) and Kill Bill: Volume 2 (2004) refer to this film: a shot and setup of Vincent Vega skidding out into the road with an overdosed Mia Wallace in the passenger seat in Pulp Fiction is copied from the opening chase of The Driver; and Beatrix Kiddo being described as "the cowgirl [who] ain't never been caught" in Kill Bill: Volume 2 is copied from Ryan O'Neal's character description in The Driver as "the cowboy who could not be caught". According to Wensley Clarkson's book, Tarantino – The Man, the Myths and His Movies, Tarantino lists The Driver as one of the "coolest movies of all time."

The film influenced several of the works of director Michael Mann. Mann initially pitched his script for Heat to Hill to direct during the 1980s.

The film also influenced Drive (2011), directed by Nicolas Winding Refn. "It's a very different movie", said Hill of this. "It has certain things, as Nic has told me, that are homage and that's fine. It's very complimentary. I bear him no animosity or anything. I think he's a remarkably talented guy and quite like him."

Baby Driver (2017), directed by Edgar Wright, was also influenced by The Driver. Wright commented on Hill's film: "Its influence on video games is very clear and in movies its style has echoed throughout the work of Michael Mann, James Cameron, Quentin Tarantino, Nicolas Refn and now me with my new film (ahem), Baby Driver."

== Unproduced remake ==
Around 1996, 20th Century Fox was developing a remake of the film to be directed by Luc Besson, who had already had huge success with films like La Femme Nikita and Leon: The Professional and was working on The Fifth Element. He worked on the script with screenwriter John Pogue, but it was not made.
