= Driver: Renegade =

2011 video game

- European cover art
- Developer: VD-dev
- Publisher: Ubisoft
- Directors: Noreudind Abboud; Xavier Penin
- Designers: Fernando Velez; Guillaume Dubail; Xavier Penin
- Programmer: Fernando Velez
- Artist: Guillaume Dubail
- Composer: Tom Salta
- Series: Driver
- Platform: Nintendo 3DS
- Release: AU: September 1, 2011; EU: September 2, 2011; NA: September 6, 2011
- Genres: Sandbox, action, racing
- Mode: Single-player

Driver: Renegade (known in PAL regions as Driver: Renegade 3D) is a 2011 action driving video game developed by VD-dev and published by Ubisoft for the Nintendo 3DS. Part of the Driver series, the game serves as a prequel to 2000's Driver 2.

== Gameplay ==
Gameplay

The game includes over 20 missions and up to 50 cars that can be tuned in the garage. Tanner's abilities include a Rage bar to take down enemy vehicles. It also includes 7 Challenge Modes including Time Attack, Elimination Mode and Road War.

The game supports the StreetPass feature alongside the online capabilities with the Nintendo Wi-Fi Connection.

== Plot ==
After saving the president, Tanner has left the NYPD and has lost faith in the corrupt police system. After leaving, Tanner applies for a job opening at Oak Lions Security, but is turned down. Suddenly, gunshots are fired and a man is seen being kidnapped. Tanner pursues the kidnapper and kills him with a crowbar. The victim turns out to be NY Senator Andrew Ballard. After driving him to Warren Nolan, Ballard's chief of security, while escaping from other criminals, Ballard offers Tanner to help him clean up crime in the city through any means possible. His main targets are Jonah Ramsey, a drug dealer, John Woodworth, a man who runs a prostitution ring, Leonard Ashton, a con-artist, Lena Robbins, an arms dealer, and Dr. Lewis, a corrupt organ trafficker. Tanner agrees to help Ballard and find the ringleader of the criminals.

Tanner first goes to ex-snitch "Sledgehammer" Bobby for clues about the senator's kidnapping. He claims to know nothing but talks after Tanner terrorizes him by smashing his brand new Roadster. Bobby tells Tanner that Ramsey planned the kidnapping due to the senator's crime campaign. Tanner's old friend, police sergeant Gordon Blunt, helps him track Ramsey to his warehouse. He pursues and kills Ramsey in a chase. Nolan arrives and tells Tanner his next target is Woodworth. Tanner goes off and smashes his phony massage parlors by driving into them. While doing so, he meets Megan Mooney, one of John Woodworth's prostitutes. After smashing the parlors, he finds her injured by Woodworth. After taking her to the hospital, she tells him Woodworth is hiding at the Paradise hotel.

Tanner and Nolan arrive at the Paradise hotel only to have their cover blown by Little Mike, his bodyguard. Tanner pursues Woodworth while Nolan takes care of Mike. After a chase, Woodworth drives his car off an overpass into a billboard, killing him. Afterwards, Tanner looks for Ashton. Tanner destroys a convoy of Ashton's men in order to cut off his cash flow to find him. He then chases a money delivery van and burns all his cash. Nolan tracks down Ashton and Tanner chases him into a baseball stadium, where Ashton crashes into a wall and is killed. Megan tells him about Dr. Lewis who tried to buy her kidney. Tanner destroys Lewis's newspaper stands to cut off his communication. He eventually finds him on a subway where he has a heart attack and falls onto the tracks. Tanner then goes after Lena Robbins.

Tanner finds a convoy of Lena's men and kills each of them. He then chases Lena, who is in a tank, and wrecks her car. He holds her and her boyfriend, Kevin, at gunpoint. Lena is then shot in the head by an unknown sniper. Kevin tells Tanner that Ballard is the ringleader and wants them dead. Tanner enlists the help of Kevin to help him get back at Ballard. Meanwhile, Captain McKenzie, still mad at Tanner, sends the entire NYPD after Tanner because he thinks he murdered Lena. Tanner escapes and talks with Megan who knew Ballard was behind it all. She tells him about a tape of Ballard at the Paradise hotel with hookers to use as evidence. Tanner gets the tape but Nolan kidnaps Megan. After chasing Nolan, Megan is killed in an explosion and Nolan escapes. Tanner then finds Nolan and chases him with Lena's tank. Wounded, Nolan tells him Ballard is leaving his estate to escape the police. Tanner leaves Nolan to die and goes after Ballard.

After finding Ballard leaving his estate, he runs his car off the road and holds him at gunpoint. He is met by McKenzie and the NYPD who tell Tanner to drop his gun. Tanner almost kills him but reminds himself he is one of the good guys. Afterwards, Tanner is arrested and is being sent to prison when Blunt arrives. Blunt tells them that the FBI wants him for a top priority case in Chicago. Tanner accepts.

== Reception ==
Reception

Aggregate score
| Aggregator | Score |
|---|---|
| Metacritic | 48/100 |

Review scores
| Publication | Score |
|---|---|
| Famitsu | 27/40 |
| GameSpot | 3.5/10 |
| NGamer | 30% |
| Nintendo Life | 5/10 |
| Nintendo Power | 3/10 |
| Official Nintendo Magazine | 68% |

Driver: Renegade holds a rating of 48/100 on review aggregate site Metacritic, indicating "generally unfavorable reviews". In Japan, Famitsu gave it a score of three sevens and one six for a total of 27 out of 40.
