= Supercross Freestyle =

2000 video game

- Developer: Velez & Dubail Dev. Team
- Publisher: Infogrames Europe
- Platform: Game Boy Color
- Release: UK: November 17, 2000
- Genres: Sports; racing
- Mode: Single-player

Supercross Freestyle is a 2000 motorbike racing game developed by Fernando Velez and Guillaume Dubail, and published by Infogrames Europe for the Game Boy Color. The game features three modes, including a conventional supercross racing mode, a freestyle trick mode, and an arcade racing mode. Supercross Freestyle received praise upon release for the diversity of game modes and controls.

== Gameplay ==
A screenshot of gameplay in Supercross Freestyle.

Supercross Freestyle features three game modes. in 'Freestyle', the player completes tricks signalled to them by successfully repeating a combination of buttons. In 'Supercross', the player completes three-lap against competitors on tracks across the world. In 'Arcade' mode, the player races against the clock on tracks whilst avoiding obstacles, such as rocks and puddles, to reach first place. In this mode, the player has a damage meter accumulated when colliding with obstacles, which can be repaired with first aid boxes collected on the track. The game features four different courses, each with three tracks, and several licensed bikes, including from Honda and Kawasaki.

== Reception ==
Reception

Review scores
Publication	Score
Computer and Video Games	4/5
Game Boy Official Magazine	84%
Game Boy Xtreme	53%
Total Game Boy	88%
Nintendo Gamer	86%

Supercross Freestyle received positive reviews from publications. Computer & Video Games praised the game's "officially licensed bikes, dazzlingly varied gameplay modes and beautiful unlockable extras, assessing it as the "on the podium for (the) best Game Boy racer ever." Similarly, Game Boy Official Magazine praised the game's "good turn of speed and slick controls", writing that the game was a "top-notch two-wheeler that wipes the floor with other motorbike speedsters." Nick Roberts of Total Game Boy praised the game as a "really fun game and great value for money." Game Boy Extreme reviewed the game negatively, writing "weak graphics and simplistic gameplay spoil this bike racer." In a retrospective review for Screen Rant, Camden Jones remarked that the game was ahead of its time, writing that the "races are visually impressive and extremely fluid-feeling for such an underpowered system, mostly due to the plethora of jumps peppered throughout, which feel like they have a real physics system behind them."
