= Reservoir Dogs (video game) =

2006 video game

- Developer: Volatile Games
- Publisher: Eidos Interactive
- Director: David Manuel
- Producer: Team Fury
- Artists: Nadine Mathias; Robert Price; Rupert Lewis Jones
- Writers: Richard Boon; James Parker
- Composers: Marc Canham; Richard Aitken; Edwin Scroggie; Todd Baker
- Engine: BlitzTech
- Platforms: Microsoft Windows, PlayStation 2, Xbox
- Release: EU: August 25, 2006; NA: October 24, 2006
- Genre: Third-person shooter
- Mode: Single-player

Reservoir Dogs is a 2006 third-person shooter video game based on the Quentin Tarantino film of the same name. It garnered mixed reviews and caused minor controversy for its heavy violence, being banned in Australia and New Zealand.

== Plot ==
The game follows the same plot as the film, only expanding it and showing the events and planning of the heist in more detail. The plot concerns eight criminals who undertake a jewelry heist, six of whom use aliases, Mr. Blonde, Mr. White, Mr. Pink, Mr. Orange, Mr. Blue, Mr. Brown, and the men responsible for planning the heist Joe and his son Eddie Cabot. During the heist, the cops arrive before the expected response time, indicating that one of the crew has tipped the cops off. Blonde, infuriated by this, goes on a shooting spree, almost jeopardising the mission. Mr. Pink manages to escape with the diamonds and hide them in a secure location. He then meets Mr. White and Mr. Orange (who has been shot and is severely bleeding) at a warehouse, as Brown was killed and Blue and Blonde are missing. After Pink and White argue about whether or not to take Orange to a hospital, Blonde arrives.

Blonde reveals that he has a tied-up police officer in the trunk of his car. After beating the cop to extract information, Eddie arrives before leaving with White and Pink to retrieve the diamonds and ditch the getaway vehicles. After the three depart, Blonde begins to torture the cop, slashing his face and slicing off his ear. He then attempts to set the cop on fire before he is shot dead by a still bleeding Orange. Orange reveals to the cop that he is an undercover cop and that backup is waiting for Joe to arrive at the warehouse before moving in. Earlier during the heist, Blue makes a last stand against the cops before being killed in a movie theater.

In the present, Eddie, Joe, Pink and White return with the diamonds and see Blonde dead. After killing the cop, Eddie confronts Orange as to why he killed Blonde, an old family friend who served four years in jail for his father's crime, accuses him of being the mole who set the job up, and threatens to kill him. White then threatens to kill both Joe and Eddie if they shoot Orange. Joe and Eddie aim at Orange while White aims at both Cabots, creating a Mexican standoff. They all fire, killing the Cabots and hitting both White and Orange. Pink, the only person who hasn't been shot, runs away with the diamonds. After White and Orange share a moment, Orange confesses he is a cop. White then points the gun at Orange's head, but police storm the warehouse before he can shoot. The police order White to surrender, but he shoots Orange before being shot and killed himself by the police.

Depending on the player's actions throughout the game, there are three possible endings for what happens afterwards with Pink:

- In the "Psycho" ending, he starts a shootout with the police and gets killed.
- In the "Neutral" ending, he tries escaping in a car with the diamonds but the police intercept and arrest him.
- In the "Professional" ending, he hides under a car as the police arrive to enter the warehouse, then successfully escapes by stealing their car while leaving the diamonds behind.

== Gameplay ==
The game consists of both third-person shooting and driving sections. The game mechanics encourage the player to take hostages and avoid mass slaughter: in the rating system, a player may be rated as a "Psycho" if many opponents are killed, or a "Professional" if they are not.

== Soundtrack ==
The original soundtrack for the game was composed by Marc Canham, Richard Aitken and Edwin Scroggie, with an additional track composed by Todd Baker. It also features the full and original soundtrack from the movie, the so-called K-Billy's Super Sounds of the Seventies, playable during the driving sections. The game was nominated in the 3rd British Academy Games Awards for Best Soundtrack.

== Reception ==
=== Critical reviews ===
Reception

Aggregate score
| Aggregator | Score | | |
| Aggregator | PC | PS2 | Xbox |
|---|---|---|---|
| Metacritic | 50/100 | 50/100 | 50/100 |

Review scores
| Publication | Score | | |
| Publication | PC | PS2 | Xbox |
|---|---|---|---|
| Computer Games Magazine | 1.5/5 | N/A | N/A |
| Edge | N/A | N/A | 3/10 |
| Eurogamer | N/A | 6/10 | N/A |
| Game Informer | 5.75/10 | 5.75/10 | 5.75/10 |
| GamePro | N/A | N/A | 2.5/5 |
| GameSpot | 4.6/10 | 4.6/10 | 4.6/10 |
| GameSpy | 1.5/5 | 2/5 | 2/5 |
| GameTrailers | 7/10 | 7/10 | 7/10 |
| GameZone | N/A | N/A | 6.5/10 |
| IGN | (UK) 7.5/10 (US) 3/10 | (UK) 7.5/10 (US) 3/10 | (UK) 7.5/10 (US) 3/10 |
| Official U.S. PlayStation Magazine | N/A | 3/10 | N/A |
| Official Xbox Magazine (US) | N/A | N/A | 4/10 |
| PC Gamer (US) | 47% | N/A | N/A |
| 411Mania | 6.7/10 | N/A | N/A |
| The Times | 4/5 | 4/5 | N/A |

The game received "mixed" reviews on all platforms according to the review aggregation website Metacritic.

=== Censorship ===
The game has been refused classification in Australia, essentially banning the game from sale. The Australia Classification Board found it could not be accommodated at the MA 15+ classification, and as such, the game has been made unavailable for sale or hire, or would not be demonstrated in Australia.

The New Zealand Office of Film and Literature Classification dubbed the game "objectionable", meaning it was not only banned from sale, but that it was illegal to possess or import a copy. The Office found the game "tends to promote and support the infliction of extreme violence and extreme cruelty…for the purpose of entertainment". For the same reasons as Australia and New Zealand, the game has not been officially released in Japan, but the film of the same name remains available.

In Germany, the game was added to the List of Media Harmful to Young Persons by the Federal Department for Media Harmful to Young Persons which means the game can only be offered and sold to adults.
