= The Drive (Thomson) =

Painting by Tom Thomson

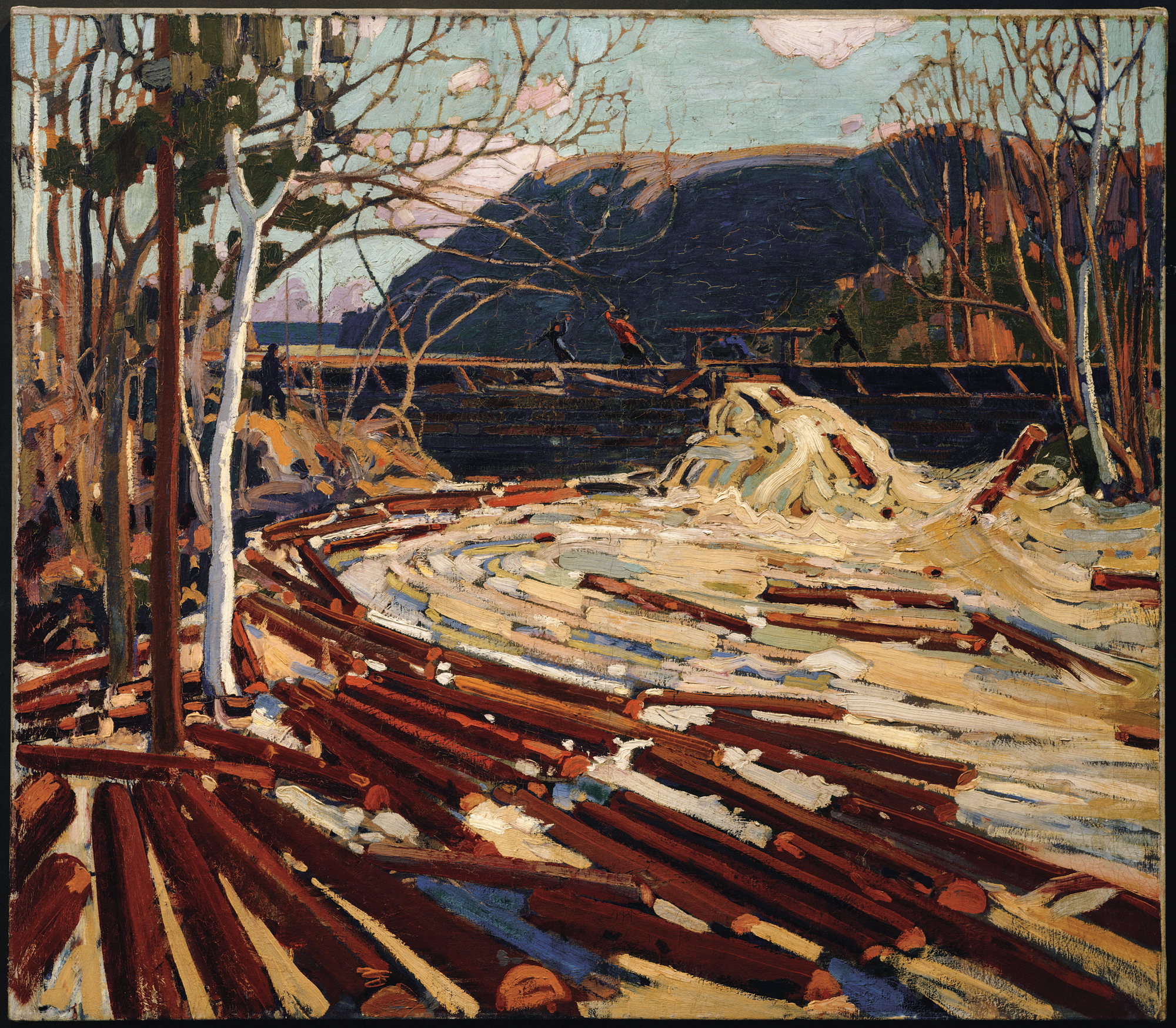
- Artist: Tom Thomson
- Year: 1916–17
- Medium: Oil on canvas
- Dimensions: 120 cm × 137.5 cm (47 in × 54.1 in)
- Location: Art Gallery of Guelph; Guelph

The Drive is an oil-on-canvas painting of 1916–17 by the Canadian artist Tom Thomson. It depicts the logging industry in Algonquin Park. A frequent subject of Thomson's work, the painting shows timbermen directing sawn logs down a canal towards the Ottawa River. It was based on sketches of Thomson's composed while he was a fire ranger in the park.
