= Kathy Driver =

South African mathematician

- Born: Kathleen Ann Owen; South Africa
- Education: University of the Witwatersrand; Stanford University
- Known for: Research in special functions, orthogonal polynomials, approximation theory
- Awards: Member of the Academy of Science of South Africa
- Scientific career
- Fields: Mathematics
- Workplaces: University of Cape Town; University of the Witwatersrand
- Thesis: (1991)
- Doctoral advisor: Doron S. Lubinsky

Kathleen Ann Driver (née Owen) (3 June 1947–13 June 2026) was a retired South African mathematician who listed her research interests as "special functions, orthogonal polynomials and approximation theory". She was an emeritus professor at the University of Cape Town.

== Education and career ==
Driver earned a bachelor's degree in mathematics at the University of the Witwatersrand, in 1966, where she was awarded the William Cullen Medal for the year's best student in the faculty of science, and the South African Association of Women Graduates Award for the best female student at the university. Next, she traveled to Stanford University for a master's degree in 1971. Returning to graduate study in later life, she completed a PhD at the University of the Witwatersrand in 1991, under the supervision of Doron S. Lubinsky.

She became a professor of mathematics and head of mathematics at the University of the Witwatersrand from 1999 through 2005, during which time the Department of Mathematics transitioned into a School of Mathematics. She moved to the University of Cape Town as professor of mathematics and dean of the Faculty of Science in 2006. She stepped down as dean in 2011, and retired as an emeritus professor in 2013.

== Recognition ==
Driver was a member of the Academy of Science of South Africa, elected in 2007.

== Death ==
On 13 June 2026, Driver passed away at the age of 79, after a brief illness.
