= HMS Driver =

Two ships of the Royal Navy have borne the name HMS Driver:

- HMS Driver (1797) was an 18-gun sloop launched in 1797, one of three ordered from builders in Bermuda (the others being HMS Dasher and Hunter. Between 1822 and 1825 Driver served in the West Africa Squadron and succeeded in capturing a Spanish slave ship. Beginning in 1825 she was used as a convict ship, and was broken up in 1834.
- HMS Driver (1840) was a wooden paddle sloop launched in 1840. She was wrecked in 1861 near Mariguana Island.

== Source ==
- Colledge, J. J.; Warlow, Ben (2006) [1969]. Ships of the Royal Navy: The Complete Record of All Fighting Ships of the Royal Navy from the 15th Century to the Present (3rd Rev ed.). London: Chatham Publishing. ISBN 978-1-86176-281-8. OCLC 67375475.
