= Jeremiah Driver =

English cricketer (1861–1946)

Jeremiah Driver (16 May 1861 – 10 December 1946) was an English first-class cricketer, who played two matches for Yorkshire County Cricket Club in 1889, against Gloucestershire and Lancashire. A wicket-keeper, he took two catches and scored 24 runs at an average of 8.00.

Born in Keighley, Yorkshire, he died in his home town in December 1946.
