= Driver: Vegas =

- Developer: Gameloft
- Publisher: Glu Mobile
- Series: Driver
- Platform: Mobile phone
- Release: 2005
- Genre: Action-adventure
- Mode: Single player

Driver: Vegas is a 2005 action-adventure game developed by Gameloft and published by Glu Mobile. Although the game is not canon, the game takes place after the events of Driver 3.

== Plot ==
The storyline of Driver: Vegas happens after the ending of Driver 3, with Tanner in the emergency room. His heart has been jumpstarted, and he decides to go after Jericho, the criminal he failed to kill in Driver 3. To do this, he must travel to Las Vegas, Nevada.

== Gameplay ==
There are some on-foot missions in Driver: Vegas, but most of the missions are driving based.

== Reception ==
Reception

Review scores
Publication	Score
GameSpot	3.9/10
IGN	8.6/10
Pocket Gamer	2/5
