= Driver 76 =

2007 video game

- Developers: Ubisoft Reflections; Sumo Digital
- Publisher: Ubisoft
- Director: Darren Mills
- Designer: Ned Waterhouse
- Programmers: Steve Camber; James Graves
- Artist: David Blewett
- Composers: Marc Canham; Andy Gannon; Ed Scroggie
- Series: Driver
- Platform: PlayStation Portable
- Release: NA: 8 May 2007; AU: 10 May 2007; EU: 11 May 2007
- Genres: Action-adventure, driving
- Modes: Single-player, Multiplayer

Driver '76 is a 2007 action-adventure and driving video game for the PlayStation Portable. It was developed by Ubisoft Reflections and Sumo Digital, and published by Ubisoft, and is the only Driver title for the system.

The game is a prequel to Driver: Parallel Lines (2006), set two years prior. Driver 76 is very similar, set in the same game world environment and sharing most of the same vehicles as well as soundtrack, with minor differences in each of these. Plotwise, it revolves around player-character Ray and his friend Slink, both of whom were supporting characters in Parallel Lines.

== Gameplay ==
Gameplay screenshot showing the player driving the car while using a weapon

Mission structure is similar to Driver: Parallel Lines, where driving is an important aspect in gameplay, shooting still remains in the game. Most missions are driving based while some are shootouts or when Ray sits in the back of a car and shoots incoming enemies. There are a total of 27 missions, grouped into 6 chapters, with the player awarded money, cars or weapons when successfully completed. Alongside these are the optional side missions such as delivering, track racing and demolition derbies.

Missions, as well as the garage of vehicles, are all accessed via a single navigatable menu rather than accessed through a fully playable open world. That also means that the player doesn't have to drive across the city to start a mission, which is the case in Parallel Lines. There is however an option for free roaming. Driver 76 also has ad hoc multiplayer modes.

Driver 76 uses comic-styled illustrations rather than cinematic cutscenes, making the game behave more like a comic book, a unique aspect among the Driver games.

== Plot ==
In New York City during the year 1976, the story starts with Ray (Brian Bloom), a wheelman. He falls in love with Chen Chi (Dionne Quan), but she's already got someone, Jimmy (Masi Oka). With the help of Slink (Geoff Brown), he gains respect from Chen Chi's father, Zhou (Clyde Kusatsu), but Ray is then betrayed and has to earn money in the meantime. He eventually meets back with Zhou who informs Ray that Jimmy is a traitor, leading to Ray and Slink attempting to take down Jimmy's empire.

== Development ==
The game was announced in January 2007. It was the first Driver title published by Ubisoft, who had purchased Reflections the previous year.

== Reception ==
Reception

Aggregate score
Aggregator	Score
Metacritic	57/100

Review scores
Publication	Score
Edge	7/10
Eurogamer	6/10
Game Informer	5/10
GameSpot	6/10
GamesRadar+	3/5
GameZone	6/10
IGN	4.5/10
PALGN	4/10
VideoGamer.com	7/10
X-Play	3/5

Driver 76 received "mixed" reviews according to video game review aggregator Metacritic.

Dave McCarthy of Eurogamer gave praise to the soundtrack, the comic-book plot presentation, and called the voice acting "first class", but was critical of controls, glitches and some of the plot narrative. IGN's Jeff Haynes was more critical for the "extremely short" story, "useless collectibles", and "weak on-foot combat".
