= Driver (video game) =

1999 video game

- European box art
- Developer: Reflections Interactive (Note: Crawfish Interactive developed the Game Boy Color version and Abersoft Limited developed the Macintosh port.)
- Publisher: GT Interactive (Note: The Game Boy Color version was published by Infogrames. MacSoft published the Macintosh port. Gameloft published the iOS and Palm Pre remakes.)
- Producer: Peter Hawley
- Designer: Martin Edmondson
- Writer: Maurice Suckling
- Composer: Allister Brimble
- Series: Driver
- Platforms: PlayStation, Microsoft Windows, Game Boy Color, Classic Mac OS, iOS, Palm Pre
- Release: 25 June 1999: PlayStation; EU: 25 June 1999; NA: 8 July 1999 Microsoft Windows; NA/UK: 1 October 1999 Game Boy Color; NA: 10 May 2000; UK: 23 June 2001 Macintosh; NA: 12 December 2000 iOS/Palm Pre; WW: 8 December 2009
- Genres: Driving, action
- Mode: Single player

Driver (subtitled "You Are the Wheelman" in North America) is an action driving video game and the first installment in the Driver series. Developed by Reflections Interactive and published by GT Interactive, it was released on the PlayStation on 25 June 1999, and was ported to Microsoft Windows on 1 October 1999, and to Classic Mac OS on 12 December 2000 by Abersoft Limited.

The game, inspired by movie car chases, sees players driving around four real-life cities – Miami, San Francisco, Los Angeles and New York – using a variety of vehicles, with the plot focusing on the work of an undercover police officer, John Tanner, who infiltrates a criminal outfit to investigate their operations, only to discover a plot by their boss to assassinate the President of the United States.

The game proved a commercial hit upon release, and received favorable reviews from critics. Ports for Microsoft Windows and Mac were released on 1 October 1999 and December 2000. A remake for the Game Boy Color, developed by Crawfish Interactive and published by Infogrames was released in May 2000, while versions for iOS and Palm Pre, developed and published by Gameloft, were released on 8 December 2009. The game was re-released on the PlayStation Network on 14 October 2008. The game's success led to further sequels, including Driver 2 in November 2000 and Driver 3 in June 2004.

== Gameplay ==
Gameplay from the PS1 release, in the mission "Taxi!" during the "Undercover" mode. Tanner is trying to scare someone sufficiently, indicated by the "Freak" meter.

The same mission as seen on iOS.

The game is played out in four cities: Miami, San Francisco, Los Angeles and New York, each of which remain only partially faithful to the actual city layouts. A fifth bonus city, Newcastle (where Reflections Interactive is based), is unlockable in the PC version through gameplay and in the PlayStation version using a cheat device, but no missions are available and the playable area is small. The game was notable at the time of its original release insofar as the player was able to explore each city as an open world environment. Driver has often been compared to the Grand Theft Auto series. It also bears significant thematic resemblances to the 20th Century Fox movie The Driver (1978).

== Plot ==
NYPD detective and former racing driver John Tanner is sent undercover by Lieutenant McKenzie to investigate a crime syndicate; McKenzie instructs Tanner to go to Miami and meet a pimp named Rufus. After arriving in Miami, Tanner uses his driving skills to prove himself to some gangsters in a parking garage, and becomes their getaway driver.

Tanner carries out jobs for various criminals before meeting Rufus, who tasks Tanner with rescuing Jean-Paul, one of his associates. Rufus is later shot dead by his girlfriend Jesse, whom Tanner apprehends, and she reveals that Jean-Paul is now in San Francisco.

Tanner goes to San Francisco, where he meets Castaldi, the head of the syndicate, and begins working directly for him. He also meets Rusty Slater, his former racing rival, who also works for Castaldi. Tanner later learns from local informant Mojo that Castaldi is working with a man named Don Hancock, who is running for president. He comes to suspect that Slater has been spying on him and wrecks Slater's car during a chase, resulting in Slater being arrested.

Castaldi's syndicate moves to Los Angeles, where Castaldi plans to assassinate FBI agent Bill Maddox. Tanner instructs Lech, a police associate, to ensure Maddox turns up; otherwise, his cover may be blown. The assassination fails and the police ambush the gangsters, forcing Tanner to take them to safety. Tanner convinces the suspicious gangsters that Slater told the police about the planned assassination. Lech later tells Tanner that McKenzie recently met with Marcus Vaughn, an FBI agent whom Tanner realizes is working with Castaldi and Hancock.

The syndicate then moves to New York, where Castaldi plans a high-profile assassination. Lech tells Tanner that Hancock has bribed several people in the FBI and that McKenzie wants him to pull out of the operation, as he worries for Tanner's cover. Tanner insists on staying undercover and keeps working for Castaldi, intent on uncovering his plan.

Tanner eventually learns that Castaldi plans to assassinate the President of the United States, and Tanner is tasked with driving the President's car. However, he ignores all instructions and takes the President to safety. McKenzie then arrives and tells Tanner that Castaldi and all of his associates, including Hancock and Vaughn, have been arrested, then offers Tanner his badge back. However, Tanner suspects that the police and FBI were involved with Castaldi, so he leaves, ignoring McKenzie completely.

== Development ==
Series creator Martin Edmonson was inspired by the very first film he saw at the cinema, 1978 crime thriller The Driver, with the tutorial level being directly lifted from a scene in the film. The destruction of vehicles in-game was inspired by Edmonson watching "real destruction derbies and banger racing" as a child and observing the "twisted metal and the battered cars" afterwards. To achieve the "sound effects of the crunching metal sound" of car crashes during development, the team "went to a wrecker's yard and hired a big JCB, and we were picking up cars and dropping them on top of other cars".

According to Spanish video game magazine Magazine 64, in 1999, GT Interactive were conducting development tests for a port to the Nintendo 64, although no such release ever materialized. In 2009, a remastered version of the game was released on the App Store. Developed and published by Gameloft, the original plot and structure were left intact, but the graphics were enhanced, the music was re-done, and voice acting was re-recorded for the cutscenes.

For the iOS version of the game, the game's original soundtrack was replaced with an entirely original soundtrack, including music from three different radio stations. The game was later delisted from the App Store.

== Reception ==
Reception

Aggregate scores
Aggregator	Score			
Aggregator	GBC	iOS	PC	PS
GameRankings	76%	81%	79%	88%
Metacritic		83/100		87/100

Review scores
Publication	Score			
Publication	GBC	iOS	PC	PS
AllGame	3.5/5		4.5/5	4/5
Destructoid		9/10		
Edge				7/10
Electronic Gaming Monthly				8.3/10
Eurogamer				8/10
Game Informer				8.25/10
GameFan				84%
GamePro			4/5	4.5/5
GameRevolution				A
GameSpot	7.4/10		8.5/10	7.7/10
GameSpy			73%	
IGN	8/10		8.9/10	9.7/10
Next Generation				4/5
Official U.S. PlayStation Magazine				4.5/5
PC Gamer (US)			78%	
Pocket Gamer		3.5/5		
TouchArcade		4.5/5		

Award
Publication	Award
Game Critics Awards	Best Racing Game (1999)

Driver was a commercial hit, with sales above 1 million units by early August 1999. In the German market, Driver's PlayStation version received a "Gold" award from the Verband der Unterhaltungssoftware Deutschland (VUD) by the end of July, indicating sales of at least 100,000 units across Germany, Austria and Switzerland. The committee raised it to "Platinum" status (200,000 sales) by the end of September. In the United States, Driver's jewel case version for computers sold 390,000 copies and earned $3.8 million by August 2006, after its release in October 2000. It was the country's 42nd-best-selling computer game between January 2000 and August 2006. As of 2000, it has sold over 4 million units worldwide and grossed $150 million in revenue.

Upon its initial release, Driver was met with very positive feedback and critical acclaim. The PlayStation and iOS versions received "favorable" reviews according to video game review aggregator Metacritic.

Jeff Lundrigan reviewed the PlayStation version of the game for Next Generation, rating it four stars out of five, and stated that "a movie buff's dream – but Driver is still great even if you aren't big on movies".

IGN's Douglass C. Perry said of the original PlayStation game: "In the history of driving games for PlayStation, there is nothing that comes close to the comprehensive, deep, and thoroughly pleasurable experience that's embedded deep in the heart of Driver [...] It fulfills driving enthusiasts' deepest desires to drive as fast as possible through major US cities and to slam into just about anything without any repercussions. In that sense, Driver is a dream come true". He went on to call it "one of the best driving games on any system". Game Revolution's Ben Silverman was equally impressed, saying: "Driver excels where other games have failed by striking a perfect balance between action and realism. Car handling is a wonderful mixture of true physics and arcade functionality—not as nitpicky and sim oriented as Gran Turismo nor as ridiculously implausible as SF Rush. Driving follows the 'easy to learn, hard to master' formula [...] Rarely does a game captivate the stoic and hypercritical Game Revolution office, but Driver has done just that". GameSpot's Ryan MacDonald was not as enthusiastic, saying: "Driver is a game that might be mediocre in its presentation but more than makes up for it in its gameplay and concept".

IGN's Mike Morrissey praised the quality of the PC port and said: "Though the PC version of Driver is a fairly straight port from the PlayStation title released in July, graphic improvements are apparent, especially at resolutions of 800x600 and over with the details cranked. Though this requires a fairly fast computer, the effect is worth it. Smooth frame rates reveal nice textures for the buildings and surroundings, translucent water in areas of Miami, and of course, lens flare". GameSpot's Erik Wolpaw was somewhat disappointed with the port, but this was negated because the original game was so strong: "Like many console-to-PC ports, Driver suffers from being translated verbatim and taking little advantage of the more powerful PC platform. However, Driver's core game design is so strikingly original and fun that it can be enjoyed without embellishment". They concluded that "it is addictive, intuitive, and fun, which are qualities sometimes overlooked in the industry's myopic pursuit of purely technical innovation. With Driver, Reflections has produced the definitive re-creation of the classic urban car-chase movie and has quite possibly introduced a new genre of driving game".

IGN's Craig Harris praised the Game Boy Color port's top down view and the controls and concluded: "I'm actually quite surprised at how well Driver turned out for the Game Boy Color. I was expecting a Point-A-to-B game like Grand Theft Auto and got a whole lot more. The missions have different elements to give the basic formula a bit more variety. It's missing a few details from the PlayStation version, but for what Crawfish had to work with hardware-wise, the development team did a great job". GameSpot's Frank Provo was critical of the sound, but aside from that, he said, "Driver is smoothness personified. Driving around is fun and exciting, the levels are varied, and the side games really do improve your skill within the main game. Even without a battery save and a two-player feature, there's really nothing major to complain about".

Reviewing the Classic Mac OS port of the game in March 2001, MacAddict editor Frank O'Connor gave the game a positive review, noting that it "plays like a dream" and described it as "hecka fun". Criticism was noted for the Macintosh version being a port of the PlayStation version as opposed to the enhanced Windows version. (Note: Despite this criticism the Classic Mac OS version is a port of the enhanced Microsoft Windows version of the game.) O'Connor noted that a "few graphical tweaks and even some rudimentary changes to the interlace would have made Driver an instant and all-time Mac classic".

Despite the general praise, the opening tutorial level set in a parking lot, where the player has to perform various stunts and moves (such as drifting and 180 degree turns) under a time limit, as well as the final mission, were criticised for excessive difficulty. Because of this, the game frequently appears in lists of "hardest PS1 games".

At the 1999 E3 Game Critics Awards, Driver won "Best Racing Game", and in 2002 it was ranked No. 12 on IGN's list of the "Top 25 PlayStation Games". The Academy of Interactive Arts & Sciences named Driver as a finalist for "Console Game of the Year" and "Console Racing Game of the Year" during the 3rd Annual Interactive Achievement Awards.
