= Driver: Parallel Lines =

2006 action driving video game

- PS2/Xbox cover art featuring player-protagonist TK driving during a cop chase, with the Empire State Building in the background
- Developer: Reflections Interactive (Note: Ported to Wii by Ubisoft Barcelona.)
- Publishers: Atari (PS2 and Xbox); Ubisoft (PC and Wii)
- Director: Tanner Harvey
- Designer: Craig Lawson
- Programmer: Gary Ushaw
- Writers: Neil Richards; Maurice Suckling
- Composers: Marc Canham; Andy Gannon; Ed Scorggie
- Series: Driver
- Platform: PlayStation 2, Xbox, Wii, Windows
- Release: PlayStation 2 & Xbox: NA: 14 March 2006; EU: 17 March 2006; AU: 23 March 2006; Wii & Windows: NA: 26 June 2007; AU: 28 June 2007; EU: 29 June 2007
- Genres: Racing, third-person shooter, action-adventure
- Mode: Single-player

Driver: Parallel Lines is a 2006 action-adventure video game developed by Reflections Interactive as the fourth installment in the Driver video game series, following Driver 3 (2004). It was released by Atari for PlayStation 2 and Xbox, followed by ports to Microsoft Windows and Wii released in 2007 by Ubisoft, which had purchased the franchise. In a departure from previous titles in the series that focused on multiple cities, Parallel Lines takes place in New York City, within the periods of 1978 and 2006, in a fully open world environment.

Driver: Parallel Lines was the first Driver game without undercover cop John Tanner as the protagonist, instead focusing on a getaway driver named TK who works with a gang but is later framed by them for the murder of a drug lord, returning after 28 years in prison for revenge. Due to the underwhelming performance of Driver 3, particularly the often-derided on-foot sections, Parallel Lines returns to the formula used in earlier games in the series, focusing on driving, although shooting remains in the game. The game received mixed reviews, with praise mainly going to its 1970s soundtrack, cinematic presentation, and city atmosphere and transition, but with certain elements of its driving, shooting and graphics criticised. It was followed up by a largely similar prequel, Driver 76 (2007), and later Driver: San Francisco (2011).

== Gameplay ==
The game is played from a third-person view and its open world can be navigated using cars and motorcycles, pictured here during 1978

Driver: Parallel Lines takes place in an entirely open world environment, in which mini-games are now accessed from the in-game world instead of from a menu, while the game also features some new elements that are common with Grand Theft Auto – visible blood when someone is shot, an "Auto-aim" feature (with manual aim also available), a money system, fully modifiable vehicles (with a test track to test out upgraded vehicles), and environment destruction (i.e., lamp posts can now be run over and fire hydrants can break, spewing water into the air).

A new felony system is incorporated in Parallel Lines, which can differentiate between personal felony and felony "attached" to vehicles the player has used. If the player attracts police attention on foot or in a certain vehicle, the player can suspend their wanted level by losing the police and entering a "clean" car, though it can be reactivated if they spend too much time in the sight of a police officer, who will eventually recognize the player as "wanted". The same principle applies to out-of-car activities such as weapon use, in which players can holster their weapon in order to lose police attention until spotted committing illegal acts again. For the Wii version, the felony bar is replaced with a "stars" system, similar to that of Grand Theft Auto, which light up when the player attracts police attention. Like Grand Theft Auto, the game features fictional, yet distinct styles of vehicles based upon real automobiles that were in use within New York between the two periods.

The control layout differs slightly from Driv3r in that swimming and jumping abilities were removed from the game, along with a separate control to do "burnouts". While this was practical on the pressure-sensitive buttons of the PS2 controller, it meant that if the game was played using a PC keyboard to drive vehicles, most of them would constantly do a burnout when accelerating at low speeds and thus reduce control. The instant replay film director mode of previous Driver games was also removed, with the only available cinematic mode being the fixed-perspective slow-motion "Thrill Camera".

The game's appearance changes significantly between 1978 and 2006. Not only does TK's appearance change from his 1970s look to a more modern appearance in 2006, but also weapons, pedestrians and vehicles. Vehicles stored in the garage from 1978 can be used in the 2006 era and vice versa, while modifications are more expensive in the modern era than in 1978. New York's scenery changes quite significantly in places, with Times Square's lights and commercial posts changing to reflect the era they are in. While the 1978 World Trade Center appears, in 2006 it's a cleared and closed site. In addition, the New York of 1978 has a rather sepia tone to it, whereas in 2006 the sky has been blue-tinted. The game's HUD, which is updated from that of Driv3r featuring a speedometer, a nitrous oxide meter, and an odometer displaying how many miles the player has driven in-game also changes in appearance, from a chrome style to an LED look. While the players can change between eras manually, it can only be done after completing the 32 missions of the story mode and unlocking the "Era Change" option. While the game completely lacks any kind of weather, it does retain a day-to-night cycle that provides notable atmospheric changes.

=== Vehicles ===
The game features over 80 cars as well as motorcycles, vans and trucks, based on real counterparts of the 1970s and earlier. They can all be customized at the Ray's Autos garage, including performance, speed, ride height, paintjobs, bodyworks, nitrous, bulletproof glass and more.

=== Setting ===
The major features of New York's skyline, such as the Empire State Building, are always visible, even from the other boroughs across the river.

The interpretation of New York City in Parallel Lines is not GPS street-accurate like True Crime: New York City's Manhattan. Instead, it's a smaller and condensed version of the city with creative liberties taken that includes all the boroughs except Staten Island, as well as Coney Island and parts of the New Jersey shore. For example, Downtown Brooklyn is present but is not accurate to its real-life counterpart. The total amount of roadways used for the game's versions of Manhattan, Brooklyn, New Jersey, Queens, and The Bronx comes to around 222.5 miles (358.1 km), making the game world larger than the combined total of all three cities (Miami, Nice, and Istanbul) found in Driv3r. The game's New York City is also more "lifelike" compared to previous games in the series – players can watch vendors sell donuts, hear NPC pedestrians talk rather than simply grunting and screaming, and take part in numerous side jobs such as cab driving and car towing. Several things are notably different in the game compared to that of real-life New York. One example of this is that the New York Police Department is simply renamed and referred to as "City Police" within the game.

While many of New York City's many landmarks, such as the Statue of Liberty, the Empire State Building, the Chrysler Building, Times Square, Central Park, the Colgate Clock in Jersey City and the Flatiron Building appear in both eras, the World Trade Center is only present in 1978. Players can access the Austin J. Tobin Plaza of the complex during that period, but cannot access it in 2006 as it is closed off by a blue colored wall. Furthermore, despite not being built until the 1980s, the World Financial Center is present in both eras opposite the World Trade Center. All of New York City's major bridges feature within the game, except the Verrazzano–Narrows Bridge, the Whitestone Bridge, the Hell Gate Bridge, and the Throgs Neck Bridge, with the player capable of traversing them freely from the start unlike some Grand Theft Auto games. An elevated portion of the New York City Subway that runs from Manhattan to Coney Island is also part of the game world, with trains running on the above ground railway system; the subway system itself is not accessible to the player as a means of transportation.

== Plot ==
In 1978, The Kid or "TK" (David Walsh) works as a getaway driver for criminals in New York City. As TK returns to Hunts Point to rest at the garage owned and run by his friend Ray Davies (Brian Bloom), Ray decides to help him move up in the criminal world by introducing him to Slink (Geoff Brown), the owner of a local strip club. Slink becomes impressed with TK's skills and eventually introduces him to two close associates – Bishop (Rodney Saulsberry) and "The Mexican" (Nolan North). The men assign TK to help assist them in the breakout of Candy (Michael Cornacchia), a criminal mastermind, from Rikers Island.

After Candy's escape, the group introduce TK to their boss Corrigan (Ian Gregory), a corrupt undercover police officer, who reveals that he intends to take over the cocaine business from the city's Colombian cartel. Candy devises a plan to capture a prominent Colombian drug lord, Rafael Martinez, and ransom him back to the cartel. TK successfully kidnaps Martinez and recovers the ransom money for Corrigan but upon handing it over, Corrigan and the others kill Martinez and betray TK, implicating him for the murder. While the gang leave to take over the cocaine trade, TK is imprisoned in Sing Sing prison for 28 years, and spends his time planning to go after the group upon his release.

In 2006, TK is released and reunites with Ray in New York. TK learns that Corrigan became the city's tyrannical Police Chief, while the other members moved into different businesses – Slink moved into the adult industry and drugs manufacturing; Bishop became a drug kingpin; and Candy set up a prostitution ring and drug moving service. TK decides to go after and kill The Mexican first, and dumps his body for Corrigan to find. Ray then introduces TK to Maria Cortez (Claudia Catalina), an employee of Candy, and works with her to get close to her boss. During this time, TK pursues both Slink and Bishop, disrupting their businesses before killing both men.

When Candy learns that TK is working for Maria, he attempts to use her in order to bait him into a trap. However, TK manages to survive it, and saves Maria before killing Candy. Upon returning to Ray's garage, Corrigan reveals that Ray has been working for him: in exchange for clearing his debts, Ray set up the assassinations of Corrigan's associates to erase all of his connections to Martinez's kidnapping and subsequent murder. After killing Ray, Corrigan flees when Maria arrives to stop him; TK realizes that she is Martinez's daughter and that she had been working for Candy to track down her father's true killer. The pair then place the bodies of Candy and Slink to be found by the police, before going after Corrigan as he flees in a helicopter. They manage to take the helicopter down and TK prepares to kill him, but acquiesces to a request by Maria to let her and her people deal with him, much to Corrigan's chagrin. As her people leave with Corrigan, TK departs on his own.

== Development and release ==
Driver: Parallel Lines revealed in August 2005, with a stated release for March 2006. Video game media reported that Reflections had "listened" to fans following the "failure" of Driver 3, by making numerous changes and spending more time driving during missions rather than on foot. The game was originally intended to include online multiplayer, but this was scrapped when it became apparent to the developers that they could not deliver a strong multiplayer mode and wanted to focus entirely on the single-player portion of the game.

It was initially released for PlayStation 2 and Xbox in 2006 in North America on 14 March, European territories starting on 17 March, and Australia on 23 March 2006. The PlayStation 2 version was released in Japan by publisher AQ Interactive's distribution subsidiary Extreme Line on 12 October 2006. Ports for Windows and the Wii were released simultaneously the following year in North America on 26 June, Australia on 28 June, and in the United Kingdom on 29 June, with Ubisoft's Barcelona studio handling the Wii port.

A limited edition version of the game was released along with the regular version. The special edition, costing slightly more, includes an extra DVD containing information about the production of Parallel Lines as well as in-game videos and character profiles. Also included with the limited edition is an official soundtrack, including twelve tracks from the game, a map of New York City and a character art mini-poster. The PAL version is dubbed "Collectors Edition", and does not contain the DVD, featuring instead the soundtrack CD and a metal case.

== Soundtrack ==
Driver: Parallel Lines features a soundtrack consisting of over 70 songs, ranging from 1970s-era rock and funk to modern alternative rock and hip-hop. The songs play while the player is in a vehicle, as if they were on the radio. Notable musicians featured on the soundtrack include Funkadelic, Can, Suicide, the Stranglers, War, Iggy Pop, Blondie, David Bowie, Parliament, the Temptations, and Average White Band in the 1978 part of the game, and Public Enemy, the Roots, TV on the Radio, the Secret Machines, Kaiser Chiefs, Yeah Yeah Yeahs, and LCD Soundsystem in 2006. "Suffragette City" by Bowie is the opening theme in the CGI intro, while Blondie's "One Way or Another" plays during the initial in-game action. The 1978 portion of the game also features some modern funk tracks recorded by session musicians especially for the game soundtrack. All music licensing and in-game composition was done by Nimrod Productions.

The full game soundtrack was released exclusively on the iTunes Store by Atari in March 2006.

== Reception ==
Reception

Aggregate score
| Aggregator | Score | | | |
| Aggregator | PC | PS2 | Wii | Xbox |
|---|---|---|---|---|
| Metacritic | 61/100 | 69/100 | 59/100 | 69/100 |

Review scores
| Publication | Score | | | |
| Publication | PC | PS2 | Wii | Xbox |
|---|---|---|---|---|
| Edge | N/A | 7/10 | N/A | 7/10 |
| Electronic Gaming Monthly | N/A | 7.67/10 | N/A | 7.67/10 |
| Eurogamer | N/A | 6/10 | 6/10 | N/A |
| Game Informer | N/A | 6.75/10 | N/A | 6.75/10 |
| GameSpot | 5.5/10 | 6.5/10 | 5.5/10 | 6.5/10 |
| GameSpy | N/A | 3/5 | 2.5/5 | 3/5 |
| GameTrailers | N/A | 5/10 | N/A | 5/10 |
| GameZone | N/A | 6.5/10 | N/A | N/A |
| IGN | N/A | 7.2/10 | 5.9/10 | 7.2/10 |
| Nintendo Power | N/A | N/A | 5/10 | N/A |
| Official U.S. PlayStation Magazine | N/A | 4/5 | N/A | N/A |
| Official Xbox Magazine (US) | N/A | N/A | N/A | 7/10 |
| PC Gamer (US) | 76% | N/A | N/A | N/A |
| Entertainment Weekly | N/A | B | N/A | B |
| The Sydney Morning Herald | N/A | 3/5 | N/A | 3/5 |

The game received "mixed or average reviews" on all platforms according to video game review aggregator Metacritic. Praise went towards the story, fixes and improvements over the previous title, but criticism went to the implementation of some elements in the new formula and the unbalanced difficulty.

IGN gave the PS2 and Xbox versions 7.2 out of 10, praising the return of the series to its roots, and mentioned that "it's still not perfect, but it's not broken either". GameSpot gave the same versions 6.5 out of 10 and called it a competent GTA clone, but far from being recommendable. Eurogamer gave the PS2 version 6 out of 10, while stating that "there's not too much shame in trying to do what GTA does, of course (and at least it's not about bloody gang warfare for once), but while this is definitely a solid improvement on its dreadful predecessor, it needed to achieve a basic level of competence and build upon it, and it only does that to a very limited extent". 1UP.com gave it a C+ and wrote: "Sure, it's derivative as hell, but there's nothing getting in the way of actually enjoying the game now".

Game Informer wrote that "Parallel Lines aimlessly drifts between wanting to be an open-world game like Grand Theft Auto and a straight-up racer along the lines of Midnight Club". Edge gave it 7 out of 10, and humorously referred to it as DRIV4R: The Apology in reference to the disappointment of its predecessor.
