= Driver 3 =

2004 video game

- European cover art
- Developer: Reflections Interactive (Note: Velez & Dubail developed the Game Boy Advance version.)
- Publisher: Atari (Note: Sorrent published the mobile version.)
- Director: Martin Edmondson
- Designers: Steve Boland; Martin Edmondson; Craig Lawson; Mark Mainey
- Programmers: Christopher Phillips; Christopher Jenner
- Artists: Phil Baxter; Andreas Tawn
- Writer: Maurice Suckling
- Composers: Marc Canham; Richard Aitken; Richard Narco
- Series: Driver
- Platforms: PlayStation 2; Xbox; BREW; J2ME; Game Boy Advance; Windows
- Release: 21 June 2004: PlayStation 2, Xbox; NA: 21 June 2004; EU: 22 June 2004; AU: 24 June 2004; Mobile; WW: 21 June 2004; Windows; NA: 15 March 2005; EU: 18 March 2005; AU: 13 April 2005; Game Boy Advance; EU: 14 October 2005; NA: 25 October 2005; AU: 28 October 2005
- Genre: Action-adventure
- Mode: Single-player

Driver 3 (stylized as DRIV3R) is a 2004 action-adventure game, the third installment in the Driver series. It was developed by Reflections Interactive, published by Atari, and released on PlayStation 2, Xbox and mobile phones in June 2004, Microsoft Windows in March 2005, and Game Boy Advance in October 2005. The game's story focuses on players assuming the role of John Tanner, an undercover FBI agent, as he investigates a car-smuggling ring across three countries, in order to identify and arrest its boss and learn who they are planning to sell a cache of stolen cars to. The game expanded upon its predecessors with on-foot sections, gun combat, and drive-by shooting, with virtual recreations of three major cities - Miami, Nice, and Istanbul - free-roam game mode, and an improvement to the series' film-making "director mode".

Driver 3 was a much-hyped and anticipated title, and although the game was a commercial success, it received mixed reviews upon release, except for the PC edition which received negative feedback from critics. While the graphics, story and driving were praised, criticism was focused on the on foot controls, awkward shooting mechanics, and performance issues, with some critics accusing Atari of rushing the game's release to avoid competing with Grand Theft Auto: San Andreas later that year. Some publications referred to the game as disastrous. The game was succeeded by Driver: Parallel Lines (2006), before being followed up by a direct sequel, Driver: San Francisco, in 2011.

== Gameplay ==
Driver 3 gameplay screenshot depicting the player driving in Istanbul

Driver 3 focuses on a mixture of open-world gameplay conducted through a third-person perspective, with it possible to change to different camera angles at any time. The game consists of primarily single-player modes of gameplay - "Undercover", the game's story mode; "Take A Ride", the game's free-roam mode, which allows players to explore one of the three cities at their own pace; and "Driving Games", a challenge mode consisting of three types of car-based games for players to try out, such as pursuing a fleeing criminal. As with previous installments, gameplay mostly focuses on driving around one of three settings, consisting of partial but faithful recreations of real-life cities, using a variety of vehicles based on real-life models, ranging from sedans and sports cars, to vans, trucks. Vehicles can be damaged over time, though players may freely leave their vehicle and switch to another within the current game world setting they are in at any time; the exception is vehicles that are mission critical to the game's story mode, as losing these constitutes automatic failure. A notoriety system keeps track of the player's actions - any unlawful action will raise this bar, with police pursuing the player if spotted by any, and the response to stopping them changing depending on the level of notoriety they have.

Driver 3 introduces new gameplay mechanics to existing ones including motorbikes and speedboats, swimming, a health bar, and gun combat. Alongside being arrested by the cops or failing objectives in story mode, players can also fail if they run out of health without finding first aid kits to recover it. Combat focuses on the use of guns, based on real-life models and featuring a mixture of pistols, shotguns, assault rifles and sub-machine guns, and grenade launchers, to take down enemies; all weapons have a limit on ammo except for the lead character's personal weapon, but more can be found from dealing with enemies, or around the game world in Take A Ride.

In Undercover Mode, players conduct a series of missions in which they must complete objectives, dealing with tasks such as escaping pursuers, reaching locations, and taking down culprits. At times, the player must complete objectives within a specific condition, such as a time-limit, with failure resulting in the player having to restart the mission. In Take A Ride, players can freely explore either Miami, Nice or Istanbul, searching for secrets, which consist of special cars and a group of hostile NPCs called "Timmy Vermicelli", a parody of Tommy Vercetti from Grand Theft Auto: Vice City. If the player completes a mission of the story or leaves Take A Ride, they can freely choose to edit a replay footage from their game with different camera angles and film effects (i.e. slow-motion). The amount of footage they can edit is predetermined and restricted in size.

The Xbox version of the game supported online leaderboards via Xbox Live. In line with other original Xbox games, online support was terminated in 2010. Driver 3 is supported on Insignia, an unofficial replacement for Xbox Live servers.

== Plot ==
Undercover FBI agents John Tanner (Michael Madsen) and Tobias Jones (Ving Rhames) are sent to Miami to investigate the "South Beach" cartel headed by Calita Martinez (Michelle Rodriguez), and her associates Lomaz and Bad Hand. When the agents notice the cartel's recent acquisition of stolen cars, they suspect that they are working for someone else to fulfill a major order. To determine where the deal for the cars will take place, Tanner poses as a wheelman and infiltrates the cartel by recovering a car from a rival gang. After impressing Calita and earning her trust with a series of tasks, Tanner is assigned to assassinate "The Gator" for betraying the cartel.

South Beach relocate to Nice, France, after The Gator's presumed demise, to secure the remaining cars on their list. Tanner makes contact with Interpol agents Vauban and Dubois, who insist on arresting the cartel while in possession of the stolen cars. Tanner refuses, and Vauban orders Dubois to conduct surveillance on the cartel. Meanwhile, Tanner focuses on acquiring the cars for Calita while fending off attacks by a rival syndicate, eventually leading to a confrontation wherein he eliminates the gang's leader. Upon discovering that Dubois was captured by the cartel during his investigation, Tanner rushes to rescue him before he is executed. Following the rescue attempt, Tanner and Dubois break into a cartel boathouse to find out the location of the deal, which will take place in Istanbul, Turkey.

Shortly after, the two are captured by the cartel, and meet their employer, Charles Jericho (Mickey Rourke). After revealing Tanner's identity, Jericho takes Tanner's gun and uses it to murder Dubois, intending to frame him for the crime. Tanner manages to escape, and makes contact with Vauban about where the cars are being shipped to, but releases little detail on Dubois' death. They travel to Istanbul, where Tanner tails Jericho to a meeting with the Bagman, a middleman arranging the sale of the cars to Russian criminals. Overhearing that The Gator survived his assassination, Tanner asks Jones to collect him before he is killed by Jericho's people, and The Gator offers information on the deal in exchange for his safety.

After reuniting with Jones, Tanner is accused of murder by Vauban, after he receives word of Dubois' death. Despite the threat of an Internal Affairs investigation, Tanner and Jones go rogue to continue investigating, and focus on tracking down Lomaz. In exchange for protection, Lomaz reveals that Calita and the Bagman are set to meet soon to exchange money for the stolen cars. Tanner and Jones monitor the meeting until Calita calls it off. While Jones attempts to pursue the Bagman, he is ambushed and forced to pull back; meanwhile, Tanner chases after Calita and captures her. After bringing her to Vauban to regain his trust, Tanner convinces Calita that Jericho is too dangerous to trust. Calita reveals that the cars have already been shipped to Russia, and that Jericho will not leave the city until he is paid.

With assistance from Istanbul's police, Tanner, Jones and Vauban stake out the arranged location of the exchange between Jericho and the Bagman. When the meeting takes place, Jericho murders the Bagman for providing him only half of the agreed money and fools police by using Bad Hand as a decoy, eventually leading to his death. Upon learning that Jericho will likely leave by train, Tanner cuts him off, forcing him to disembark and flee through the streets. When Jericho is cornered in an alleyway, Tanner critically wounds him, but eventually decides to have him arrested, only for Jericho to gun him down when he turns his back on him. Both men are taken to the hospital in critical condition, setting up the opening to Driver: San Francisco.

== Development and release ==
The game had a development budget of $17 million and a marketing budget of $17 million. The game was in development for around three and a half years. Special attention was paid in rendering the cities of Miami, Nice, and Istanbul. The in-game music was composed by Marc Canham, Rich Aitken, and Narco. Atari also shot a short promotional video about Driver 3 called Run the Gauntlet.

The game was originally announced by Infogrames on 17 July 2002 for a 2003 release. Initially scheduled to release in Q4 2003, it was delayed to Q2 2004, and again from March to June of 2004. It was eventually released under Atari's publishing label for PlayStation 2 and Xbox in 2004 on 21 June in North America, 22 June in the United Kingdom, and on 24 June in Australia. The mobile version, developed and published by Sorrent, was released on the same day as the North American console versions. It was developed on both Java and BREW platforms. A Windows port of the game touted as having an enhanced graphics engine was released on 15 March 2005 in North America, 18 March 2005 in the United Kingdom, and on 13 April 2005 in Australia. Developed by Velez & Dubail, a separate version of the game was released in 2005 for Game Boy Advance in the United Kingdom on 14 October, in North America on 25 October, and in Australia on 28 October. Further ports for GameCube and N-Gage were planned, but later cancelled.

== Reception ==
Reception

Aggregate scores
Aggregator	Score				
Aggregator	GBA	mobile	PC	PS2	Xbox
GameRankings	50%	79%	41%	58%	60%
Metacritic	N/A	N/A	40/100	57/100	56/100

Review scores
Publication	Score				
Publication	GBA	mobile	PC	PS2	Xbox
Edge	N/A	N/A	N/A	3/10	3/10
Electronic Gaming Monthly	N/A	N/A	N/A	7.5/10	7.5/10
Eurogamer	N/A	N/A	N/A	N/A	3/10
Game Informer	N/A	N/A	N/A	6/10	6/10
GamePro	N/A	N/A	N/A	2.5/5	2.5/5
GameRevolution	N/A	N/A	N/A	D+	D+
GameSpot	N/A	7.5/10	3.8/10	5.4/10	5.4/10
GameSpy	N/A	4/5	N/A	N/A	2/5
GameZone	N/A	N/A	N/A	5.9/10	5.7/10
IGN	N/A	8/10	5.4/10	5.4/10	5.5/10
Nintendo Power	5.5/10	N/A	N/A	N/A	N/A
Official U.S. PlayStation Magazine	N/A	N/A	N/A	3.5/5	N/A
Official Xbox Magazine (US)	N/A	N/A	N/A	N/A	4.8/10
PC Gamer (US)	N/A	N/A	51%	N/A	N/A
The Cincinnati Enquirer	N/A	N/A	N/A	3/5	3/5
The Times	N/A	N/A	N/A	5/5	5/5

Driver 3 received "mixed or average" reviews on all platforms except the PC version, which received "generally unfavorable reviews", according to video game review aggregator website Metacritic.

The Times gave it all five stars, saying: "The graphics are divine, with vast urban locales and spectacular crashes. The cars handle well, and each vehicle has its own characteristics. Yet this is no easy driving game — one of the reasons why, subject matter aside, it carries a 16+ rating". Playboy gave it an 88% and stated: "Your investigation jump-starts reckless car chases through more than 150 miles of highways and city streets in detailed re-creations of Miami, Nice, and Istanbul. Slam into any of the 30,000 buildings and your car crumbles realistically". However, The Cincinnati Enquirer gave it three stars out of five and called its controls and animation "unresponsive and stiff".

=== "DRIV3Rgate" ===
While Driver 3 received mostly mixed reviews, two outlets operated by Future plc, PSM2 and Xbox World, gave the game 9/10 scores. This disparity led some gamers and journalists to claim that the early access Atari gave Future was contingent on receiving favorable ratings, but Atari and Future denied any wrongdoing. The incident was dubbed "Driv3rgate".

After the accusations of review fixing arose, the GamesRadar forums (also operated by Future) were filled with critical posts, many of which were deleted by moderators. Although the comments were said to be removed for being libelous, some users suspected a cover-up. Some comments defending Driver 3 and Future were traced by forum moderators to Babel Media, a marketing company that made use of astroturfing. The users admitted they worked for Babel, but said that they were posting on their own behalf, not for Babel. The thread was eventually deleted in its entirety.

=== Sales ===
The PlayStation 2 version of Driver 3 received a "Platinum" sales award from the Entertainment and Leisure Software Publishers Association (ELSPA), indicating sales of at least 300,000 copies in the United Kingdom. The game sold more than 3 million copies by December 2004.

The BREW mobile version of Driver 3 was the ninth most downloaded game on Verizon Wireless's Get It Now service from January to May 2005.
