= Canvas (disambiguation) =

Canvas is a heavy-duty fabric, used for making sails and as a support for an oil painting.

Canvas may also refer to:

== Creative works ==
=== Music ===
- Canvas (album), a 2005 album by Robert Glasper
- Canvas, a 2017 album by Moya Brennan
- Canvas (NU'EST EP), 2016
- Canvas (Junho EP), 2017
- "Canvas" (song) (2009), by Imogen Heap
- Canvas, a mini-album by Leo
- "Canvas", a song by Holly Miranda from The Magician's Private Library

=== Films ===
- Canvas (2006 film), a film starring Joe Pantoliano and Marcia Gay Harden
- Canvas (2010 film), a Malayalam-language film
- Canvas (2020 film), an American animated short film

=== Anime ===
- Canvas: Sepia-iro no Motif, a 2000 Japanese computer game
- Canvas 2: Akane-iro no Palette, a 2004 Japanese computer game
  - Canvas 2: Niji Iro no Sketch, a 2005 anime television series adaptation

== Television ==
- CANVAS, arts and culture coverage on PBS NewsHour
- VRT Canvas, a Belgian-Dutch television channel

== Geography ==
- Canvas Creek, a stream in British Columbia, Canada
- Canvas, West Virginia, an unincorporated community in Nicholas County, West Virginia, United States

== Technology ==
- Canvas element, part of HTML5
- Canvas (software), a web-based learning management system (LMS) from Instructure
- Canvas X, formerly Canvas, a graphics, drawing, image, and layout editing software application
- Project Canvas (now known as YouView), a UK subscription-free IPTV environment
- Canvas Networks, an image-centric social website created by Christopher Poole
- Canvas (GUI), an interface display component sometimes called a "scene graph"
- GoCanvas, formerly called "Canvas", a company makes mobile apps for data collection and file sharing

== Other ==
- A template and its application as a method in business planning, e.g. the Business Model Canvas
- CANVAS, Centre for Applied Nonviolent Action and Strategies
- Floating canvas, the cloth-construction inside a jacket or coat
- Canvas Stadium, a sports venue at Colorado State University
- Canvas (car company), American vehicle subscription company
- Cerebellar ataxia, neuropathy, vestibular areflexia syndrome, a neurological disorder

== See also ==
- Blank Canvas (disambiguation)
- Canvass (disambiguation)
