= Drove =

Drove may refer to:

- Drovers' road, a route for driving livestock on foot
- Past tense verb of driving
- Drove chisel, tool used by stonemasons for smoothing off roughly finished stones
- Drove, a group of hares
- Drove, a number of cattle driven to market or new pastures
- Drove, a narrow drainage corridor used in the irrigation of land

== See also ==
- Drive (disambiguation)
- Drover (disambiguation)
