= Social media use in education =

Social media in education is the use of social media to enhance education. Social media are "a group of Internet-based applications...that allow the creation and exchange of user-generated content". It is also known as the read/write web. As time went on and technology evolved, social media has been an integral part of people's lives, including students, scholars, and teachers. However, social media is controversial because, in addition to providing new means of connection, critics claim that they damage self-esteem, shorten attention spans, and increase mental health issues.

A 2016 dissertation presented surveys that focused on the impact of social media. It reported that 54.6% of students believed that social media affected their studies positively (38% agree, 16.6% strongly agree). About 40% disagreed, and 4.7% of students strongly disagreed. 53% of female students reported that social media negatively impacted their studies. Among male students, 40% agreed that social media had a negative impact on studies, while 59% disagreed.

A 2023 article dives deep into the rewards system of the brain in response to social media. This study compares the social rewards system in our brain to those from social media. From ages 10-12, most are receiving a cell phone, social rewards in the brain start to feel more satisfying. Leading to adulthood, the effects of social rewards are less likely to feel reliant on feedback from peers. Equivalent to a more mature prefrontal cortex, this enables a better management of their emotional reaction to these social rewards, meaning a more balanced and controlled reaction.

== History ==
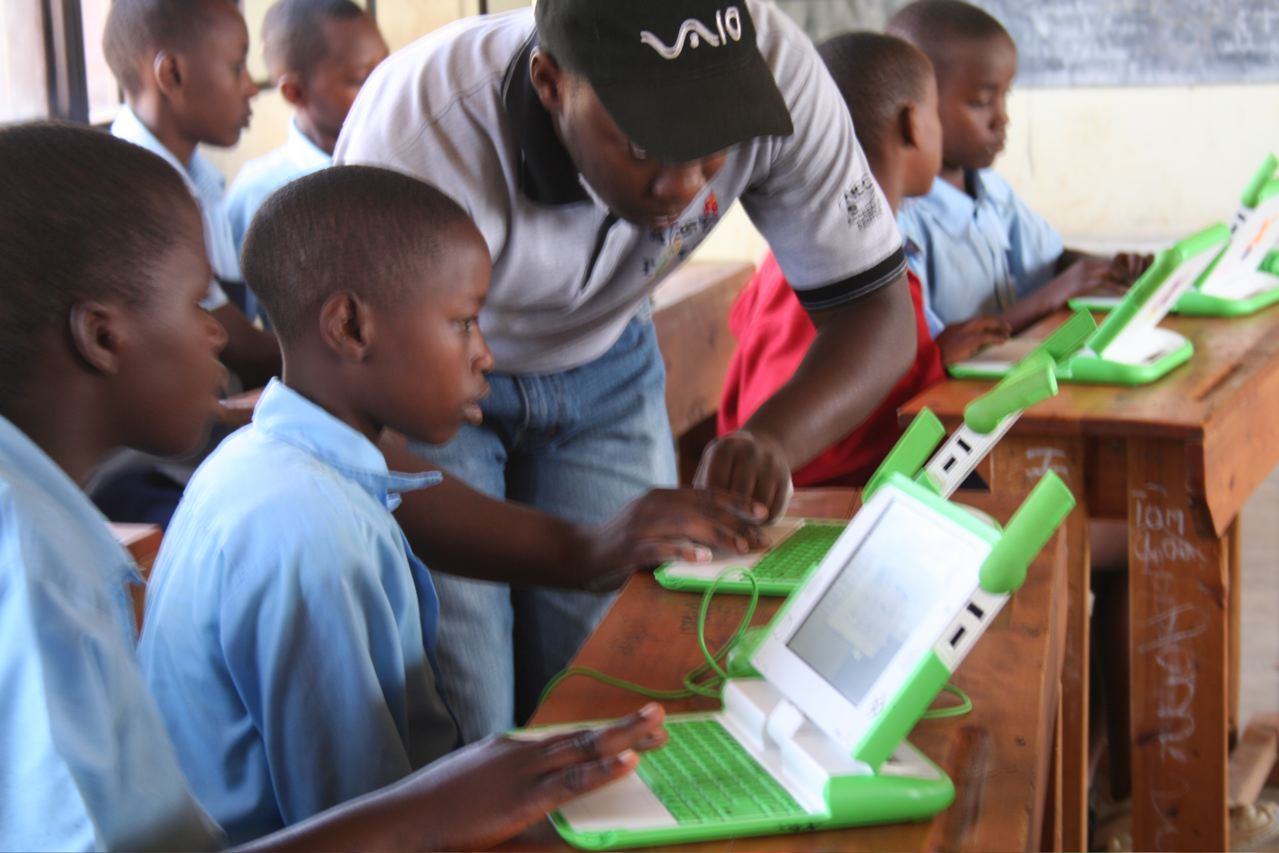
Students enjoying the usage of technology in a school environment.

A survey from Cambridge International of nearly 20,000 teachers and students (ages 12–19) from 100 countries found that 48% of students use a desktop computer in class, 42% uses phones, 33% use interactive whiteboards and 20% use tablets. Desktop computers are more used than tablets. Teachers were abandoning the "no phones at school" rule.

A 2024 research survey through Common Sense Education reported 54% of age 8-12 and 69% of ages 13-18 social media is an extensive distraction from homework.

=== United States ===
The long-running technology boom accelerated after the millennium. As of 2018, 95% of US teenage students had access to a smartphone and 45% said they were online almost constantly.

In the early days of social media, access to technology was a significant issue as many students did not own not compatible devices and school budgets were often insufficient to purchase devices for student use.

Despite backlash, Missouri passed a law that prohibited teachers from communicating privately with students over social media in 2011. Supporters were concerned that online communication between underage students and faculty could lead to inappropriate relationships.

Some schools adopted a "Bring Your Own Device" (BYOD) policy, allowing students to bring Internet-accessing devices, such as phones or tablets to class. During the pandemic, the federal government offered funds that allowed more schools to purchase devices. Over time, more students acquired phones with social media access. Personal devices increased student satisfaction, but reduced teachers' ability to control device use in their classrooms.

A 2018 Pew Research study reported that 95% of teenagers had a phone and used social media consistently.

=== Canada ===
The Peel District School Board (PDSB) in Ontario accepted the use of social media in the classroom. In 2013, the PDSB introduced BYOD and unblocked many social media sites. That was later replaced by a policy that dealt specifically with social media.

== Uses ==
=== Classroom ===
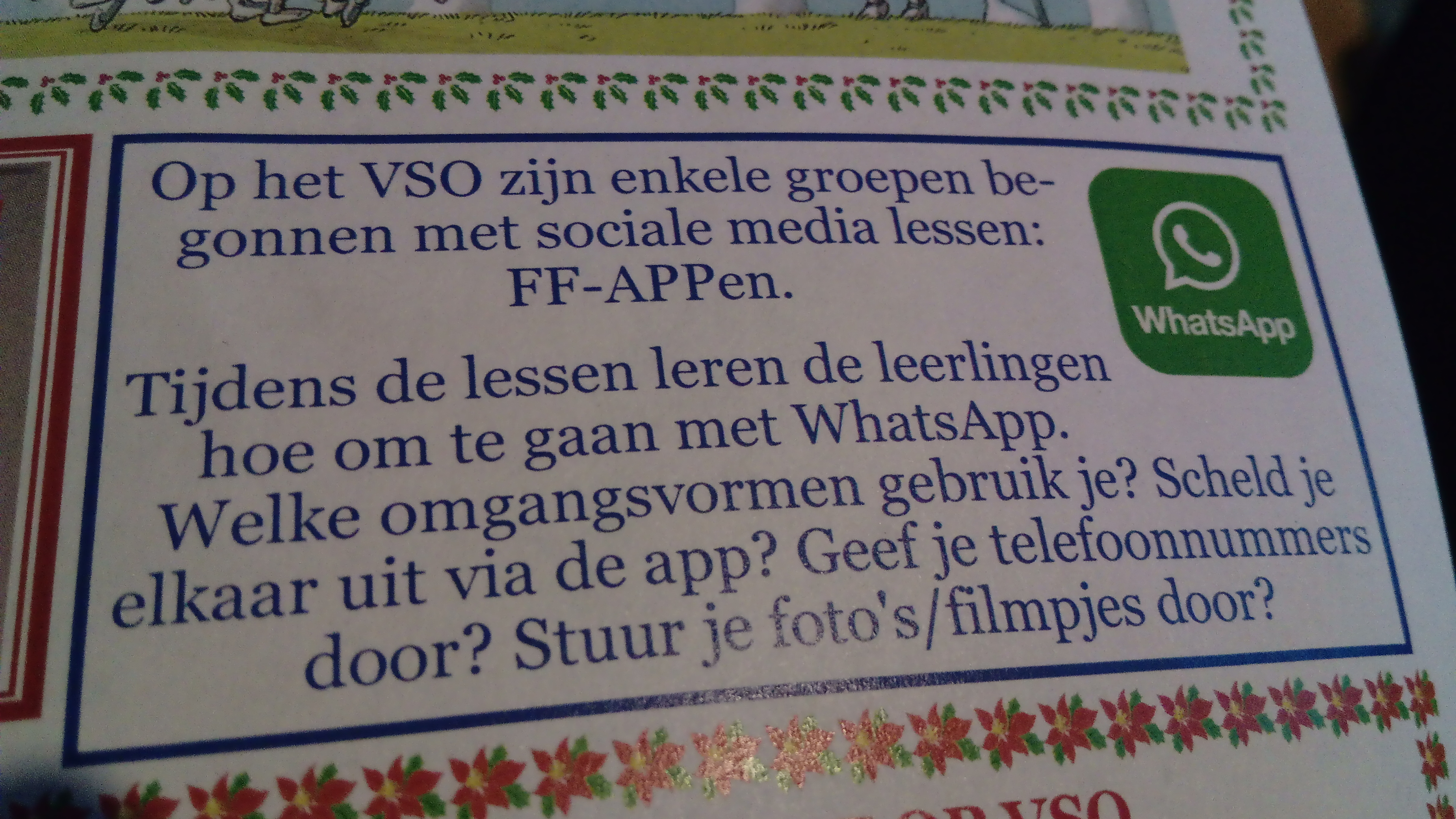
A notice for children on acceptance behavior while using social media in Rotterdam, Netherlands.

In the classroom, social media offers a way to systematically distribute and gather information from students. Teachers can communicate and engage to enhance learning in higher education classrooms.

One study on higher education reported that higher education and social media:

- Enhanced media/digital literacy
- Motivational increases
- learning opportunities
- offered more ways to learn
- Opportunity for multimedia communication skill development

Frustrations included anti-technology instructors, device challenges, and devices as a distraction.

Social media in classrooms can have a negative effect. A Yale University publication reported that students who used laptops in class for non-academic reasons had poorer performance. Students spent most of their time on social media, shopping, and other personal activities.

Social media has helped many educators mentor their students more effectively in the classroom.

=== Outside of class ===
Social media offer a venue for video calls, stories, feeds, and game playing that can enhance the learning process.

Teachers can utilize social media to communicate with their students.

Social media can provide students with resources that they can utilize in essays, projects, and presentations. Students can easily access comments made by teachers and peers and offer feedback to teachers.

Social media can offer students the opportunity to collaborate by sharing information without requiring face to face meetings.

Social media can allow students to more easily connect with experts, to go beyond course materials. Instructors in a 2010 study reported that online technologies (social media) can help students become comfortable having discussions outside the classroom better than traditional means.

Teachers may face some risk when using social media outside the classroom, without appropriate work rules.

Studies explores how college students' engagement with social media platforms influences their communication preferences and habits, particularly in relation to using school email for academic purposes.

=== Professional development ===
Social media can aid professional development, as teachers become students, enhancing knowledge transfer, skill master, and collaboration. Social media can provide teachers background knowledge of students that enhances their skills with the students.

=== Non-academic uses ===
Schools can use social media to make public announcements. Teachers and administrators can communicate other important information to parents and students and to receive feedback from them. Families can keep up with school events and policies.Schools can communicate with parents to receive updates for their children.

=== Ecology education ===
The potential of using social media in ecological, nature and forest education include:

1. virtual nature groups can help promote good habits in forest tourism and recreation (nature ethics), by entering general rules in the regulations by administrators, e.g. "DO NOT PICK UP PLANTS UNKNOWN TO US", which is to protects rare species from pointless picking.
2. social media activity motivates people to learn about nature in the field, allows them to gain knowledge, dispels popular myths, enables contact with scientists and practitioners, promotes valuable literature, websites, and at the same time reveals distortions and substantive errors in popular news services.
3. contact is not only virtual. Despite financial barriers and distance, Internet users organize nature conventions. Such meetings are an opportunity not only to make friends, but also to learn about nature together and have fun.
4. the possibility of contact between scientists and nature lovers via Facebook has become a source of cooperation in species inventory, e.g. the online campaign of the NATRIX Herpetological Society, which consists not only of collecting reports of observations of the smooth snake by Internet users, but also of drawing attention to the biology and threats to this species.

Social media has become a place where ecology education quickly reaches people of different ages and social statuses. The nature groups that have been created, in which nature enthusiasts, biologists, foresters and scientists participate, can contribute knowledge and data collection through citizen science.

== Apps and services ==
Social media can allow students to participate in their field by working with organizations outside the classroom. By offering easier access to peers outside the classroom, students can broaden their perspectives and find support resources.

Social media aided learning outside of the classroom through collaboration and innovation. One specific study, "Exploring education-related use of social media," called this "audience connectors". Audience connectors bring students together while studying with WhatsApp and Facebook. This study reported that "60 percent [of students in the study] agreed that technology changes education for the better." While social media can promote a beneficial education platform, downsides exist. Students may become skilled at "lifting material from the internet" rather than enhancing their personal understanding. Another downside is student attention spans decline. A concern raised by the students of this study showed how many use spell-check as a crutch and will see a trend of points taken off when spell-check is not an option.

Apps like X allowed teachers to make classroom accounts where students can learn about social media in a controlled context. Teachers can post assignments on the class account and students can practice commenting on, reposting, and liking posts.

Some researchers report that social media applications such as blogging may help kids become creative. Some studies particularly refer to the convenience that social media offers for shy students and youngsters who are thus enabled to exchange and express views.

College institutions are adapting social media into their educational systems to improve communication with students and the overall quality of student life. It provides colleges with an easy and fast method of communication and provides another medium for giving and receiving feedback to/from students. Almost all college students use some form of social media. Studies reported that 99% of college students who use social media use Facebook and 35% use X. Other popular services include Instagram, Reddit, and Tumblr. Many American classrooms created social media pages where teachers post assignments and interact with students. Schools have made rules for how students and faculty interact online. A 2013 study reported that students and young adults are using newer social media platforms more than ever before. They are using these platforms to connect with other students and to keep up with their school. Many schools adapted to using social media outlets by 2021. Outlets such as YouTube and Zoom can record classes and lectures and post them to allow students to watch them outside class and dedicate more class time to other activities. Newer services include Zoom, Slack, Instagram, Blackboard, Google Classroom, Canva, and Canvas.

Discord has also been used as a communication and collaboration platform in higher education. Wiles and Simmons described its use in undergraduate biology courses and laboratories, where the researchers reported that it facilitated real-time communication between students and instructors and provided opportunities for group interaction outside scheduled class time.

=== Facebook ===
Using Facebook in class allows for both asynchronous and synchronous speech via a familiar medium that supports multimodal content such as photographs, video, and links to other pages and sites. Further, it allows students to ask questions that they might not otherwise feel motivated to ask in person. Students manage their own privacy settings. Facebook is an alternative means for students to be able to voice their thoughts in and outside the classroom. Students can organize their thoughts in writing before expressing them. Further, the level of informality typical to Facebook can aid self-expression and encourage more frequent student-and-instructor and student-and-student interactions. Towner and Munoz note that such informality may not be comfortable for all educators and students.

Facebook may be less efficient than conventional course management systems, both because of its limitations in uploading assignments and due to resistance to its use in education. Specifically, some features of student-to-student collaboration may be conducted more efficiently on dedicated systems that support organization of posts in a nested/linked format. That said, several studies suggest that students post to discussion forums more frequently and are generally more active participants on Facebook posts versus conventional (WebCT, Blackboard).

However, students with parents who have college experience are more likely to be active users than others. The latter students may benefit from additional support in adapting to online activities.

=== X ===
A chart showing the content of "Tweets"–messages posted online on X. By far, the largest categories of "Tweeting" were "pointless babble" and "controversial" topics.

X can be used to enhance communication building and critical thinking. A 2013 study utilized X in a graduate seminar, requiring students to post weekly to extend classroom discussions. Students reportedly used X to connect with content and other students. Students reported it "to be useful professionally and personally". A 2011 study of 132 students examined the link between social media and student engagement and social media and grades. They divided the students into two groups in which one used X while the other group did not. X was used to discuss material, organize study groups, post class announcements, and connect with classmates. Students in the X group achieved higher GPAs and greater engagement scores.

A 2012 review examined literature about X published between 2008 and 2011. They concluded that X allowed students to participate with each other in class (by creating an informal "back channel") and extend discussion outside of class time. They reported that students used X to get news and connect with professionals in their field. Students reported that X-style microblogging encouraged students to "participate at a higher level" and that because posts could not exceed 140 characters, students were required to communicate concisely. Some students found microblogging to produce information overload. The research reported that many students did not participate in the discussions, limiting themselves to reading other participants' posts.

=== YouTube ===
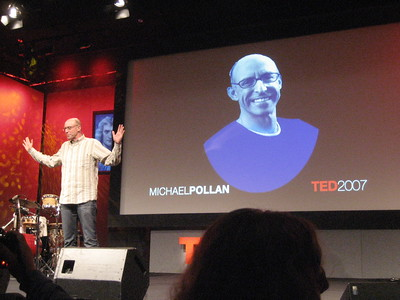
Michael Pollan is pictured on the TED stage to give his presentation "A plant's-eye view". In this discussion of looking at society from the point of view of a plant, he reveals his radical views on politics, the economy, and the world in general.

YouTube is frequently used as a classroom tool. Students can watch videos, comment, and discuss content. Students and teachers can also create videos. A 2011 study reported that YouTube increased participation, personalization (customization), and productivity. Students' digital skills improved and peer learning and problem-solving increased. A 2012 study reported that videos kept students' attention, generated subject matter interest, and clarified course content. Students reported that videos helped them recall information and visualize real-world applications.

In the early 2000s, Salman Khan began uploading short educational videos to YouTube. His videos grew popular, leading to the formation Khan Academy, which formalized and commercialized the project. Another popular YouTube channel is TED that posts TED Talks, (videos of presentations and discussions). Professionals such as scientists, researchers, doctors, and others present concise lectures aimed at a general audience. A 2021 study reported that YouTube caters to diverse learning styles. Videos on YouTube have proliferated to the extent that in-depth content is available on essentially every topic.

=== Learning management systems ===
Blackboard, Moodle, and Slack created platforms to enhance learning and monitor assignments. For instance, LMSs provide communication tools such as forums and chat rooms. Forums create a space where students can share ideas, ask questions, and collaborate. While these systems support social functions, they are somewhat distinct from conventional social media as their primary goal is to support learning and teaching rather than social interaction.

=== Slack ===
Slack (2007) has been a communication device that has been used by employees and jobs worldwide. It has the basic features of any social media site - writing, videos, replies and messages are the main usages by workers. It has a similar design like Twitter and Discord and with the familiar design used by students alike, creating networks for teachers and students to use for writing and connecting with their peers.

Slack's design makes it user friendly for both students and teachers to use on any assignments or projects they might have to do. The way it's used makes it easy for students to be "involved and energetic" about writing. This comes from the usability of social media. Via a smartphone option, it allows students to be mindful about how they can use an app to do learning in a classroom. Schools, ultimately, have an inexpensive option that provides students with another way to access learning.

In the educational context, Slack serves as a platform for collaboration. Teachers and students use it to create channels for class discussions, share resources, and manage group assignments. Public and private channels make it possible to declare a difference between transparency and inclusivity and a selected audience. Additionally, its union with other apps like Google Drive and Zoom enable seamless workflows, particularly in remote learning environments. Its accessibility across devices ensures that participants can remain connected and engaged.

However, there are a few problematic issues with Slack. Data protection is updated infrequently, and complete issues with online work as interactions could be lessened.

== Impacts ==
=== Communication skills ===
A 2010 study reported that students were using social media more, and that this was positively impacting their communications. Studies by Maqableh, Quteshat, Masadeh, and Huda Karajeh in 2015 did not demonstrate negative impacts of social media on students. It has led to a deeper understanding of class material.

Weisberger hypothesized that social media can increase learning engagement levels (student-student, student-instructor, and student-content) and the development of learning skills, such as reflection, critical thinking, construction of knowledge and understanding of one's learning process. According to a 2014 review this was supported by Junco, Heiberger, and Loken (2011) and Blaschke, Porto, and Kurtz (2010).

In 2020, a study done in order to Explore the Role of Social Media in Collaborative Learning suggests that there is a significant positive correlation between using social media for academic use and increased student participation. Because of the increase in student engagement, there is also a positive correlation in the students' academic performance.

=== Distraction ===
As the use of technology and social media has become more prevalent, some educators and parents have argued that they distract students in the classroom. This led many schools to block Internet access (including social media), or to ban phones in the classroom.

In the article neaToday by Kira Barrett it says "Recently, she noticed a student acting out in her classroom. “She was especially agitated and disrupted the class. After working with her, I found that she had a lot more going on, and it had to do with Instagram. Her so-called friends had called her names the evening before.”

=== Inappropriate posting ===
Since the 2010s, debate has continued about whether phones and social media have a place in the classroom. Many parents and educators are concerned about the potential negative impact of social media use, and a possibility that disturbing images can be sent and more negative opinions and events could be shared throughout interactions with one another. Concerns include cyberbullying and distribution of other inappropriate content. Cyberbullying can lead to legal consequences for the perpetrator and emotional and physical harm that can lead to fatal consequences. In higher education privacy concerns, anti-social interactions, and discriminatory behaviour have been observed.

Indiscreet posting can end careers or limit future options for students. Some young people remove themselves from social media to reduce such risks.

=== Mental health ===
One study reported that overuse of social media can harm the expression of critical thought. Social media use for education can be detrimental to students' mental health. One survey of teens and young adults reported that increased use of social media led to anxiety, depression, and lack of self-esteem, disrupting learning. In the article neaToday by Kira Barrett it says "The higher the cellphone use, the more time spent on social media, and the higher the anxiety. Peer relationships actually get worse the more you use your phone.”

Anxiety and depression in adolescents are rapidly increasing, which multiple studies attributed to growing social media usage by teens. Teenagers may lack the life experience to handle social media. Participating in social media puts people at risk of cyberbullying and cyberstalking. Communicating on social media may lack the social cues that moderate behavior during face-to-face communication.

According to research, by Jean Twenge and Jacob Barkley it has been found that teenagers who spend five or more hours each day are 71% more inclined to show signs of suicide risk such as depression and thoughts of suicide or planning, for suicide attempts. Furthermore, even spending two hours or more online is closely associated with the emergence of these risk factors. Social media can amplify feelings of loneliness among teenagers when they constantly measure themselves against the versions of others' lives portrayed online. This situation is worsened by cyberbullying and the absence of face, to face interactions that can contribute to increased health challenges.

Teachers have noticed a decline, in students’ face to face communication skills in the classroom setting Recently there have been reports from educators like Coria McAbee and Katrina Smith about rising health concerns among students including anxiety and FOMO (the fear of missing out) believed to be linked to their interactions, with social media platforms In the realm of education there is a consensus, among educators and specialists on the significance of including health education, in school curricula aiming to assist students in coping with social media stress and acquiring skills to identify and cope with anxiety effectively.

=== Student-teacher interactions ===
Personalized communication can be misconstrued. In some settings teachers are required to maintain professionalism in social media communication with students.

Other challenges have been observed. Some students may be more proficient at using social media than their teachers. Teachers may have limited time to dedicate to mastering a new technology. Statistics show about 40% of teachers don't use social media as a day-to-day learning device.

Social media makes students view their fellow teachers and school system more positively when it becomes present that it was a part of their curriculum.

== See also ==
- Blended learning
- Distance education
- Educational game
- Educational technology
- Edutainment
- Mobile learning
