= Drover =

Drover or Drovers may refer to:

== Animal moving ==
- Drover, a person who moves animals over long distances in droving
- Drover (Australian), a person who moves animals over long distances in Australia
- Drover (dog), a dog used for droving

== People ==
- Sam Drover (1911–2005), Canadian politician
- Shawn Drover (born 1966), Canadian heavy metal drummer
- Glen Drover (born 1969), Canadian heavy metal guitarist

== Vehicles ==
- de Havilland Australia DHA-3 Drover, a small transport aircraft
- Holden Drover, a sport utility vehicle

== Other ==
- Drovers (fictional farm), a fictional farm in the television drama McLeod's Daughters
- Drovers Magazine, a monthly magazine
- The Drovers, a Chicago rock band
- Drover, a character from the Hank the Cowdog books
- Drover (company), a London-based company
- USAO Drovers, University of Science and Arts of Oklahoma team nickname

== See also ==
- Driver (disambiguation)
- Drove (disambiguation)
- Drovers' road
- Stock route
- Drovers Cave National Park
- Drovers Inn
