= Droving =

Practice of walking livestock over long distances

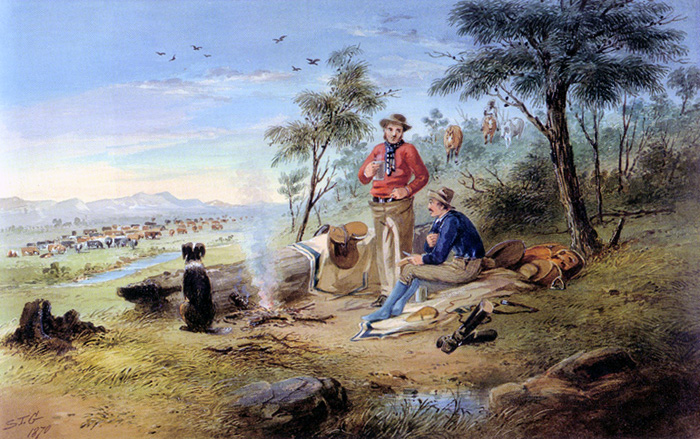
Drovers in Australia c. 1870

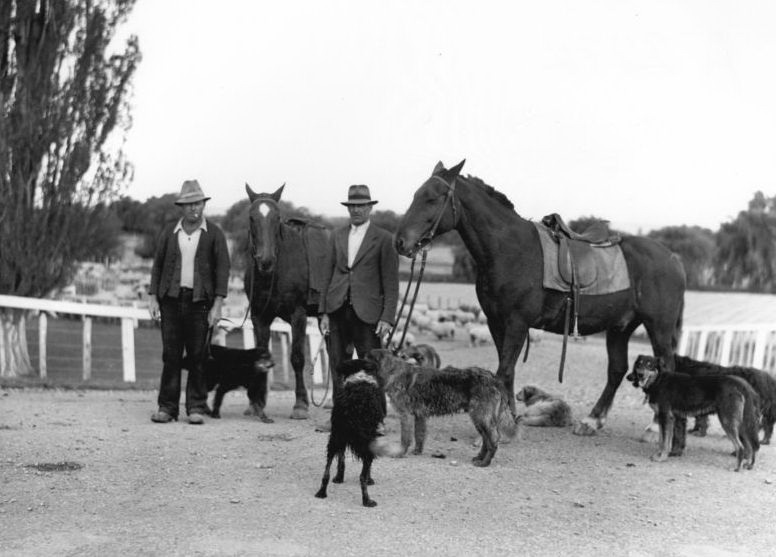
Drovers in New Zealand c. 1950

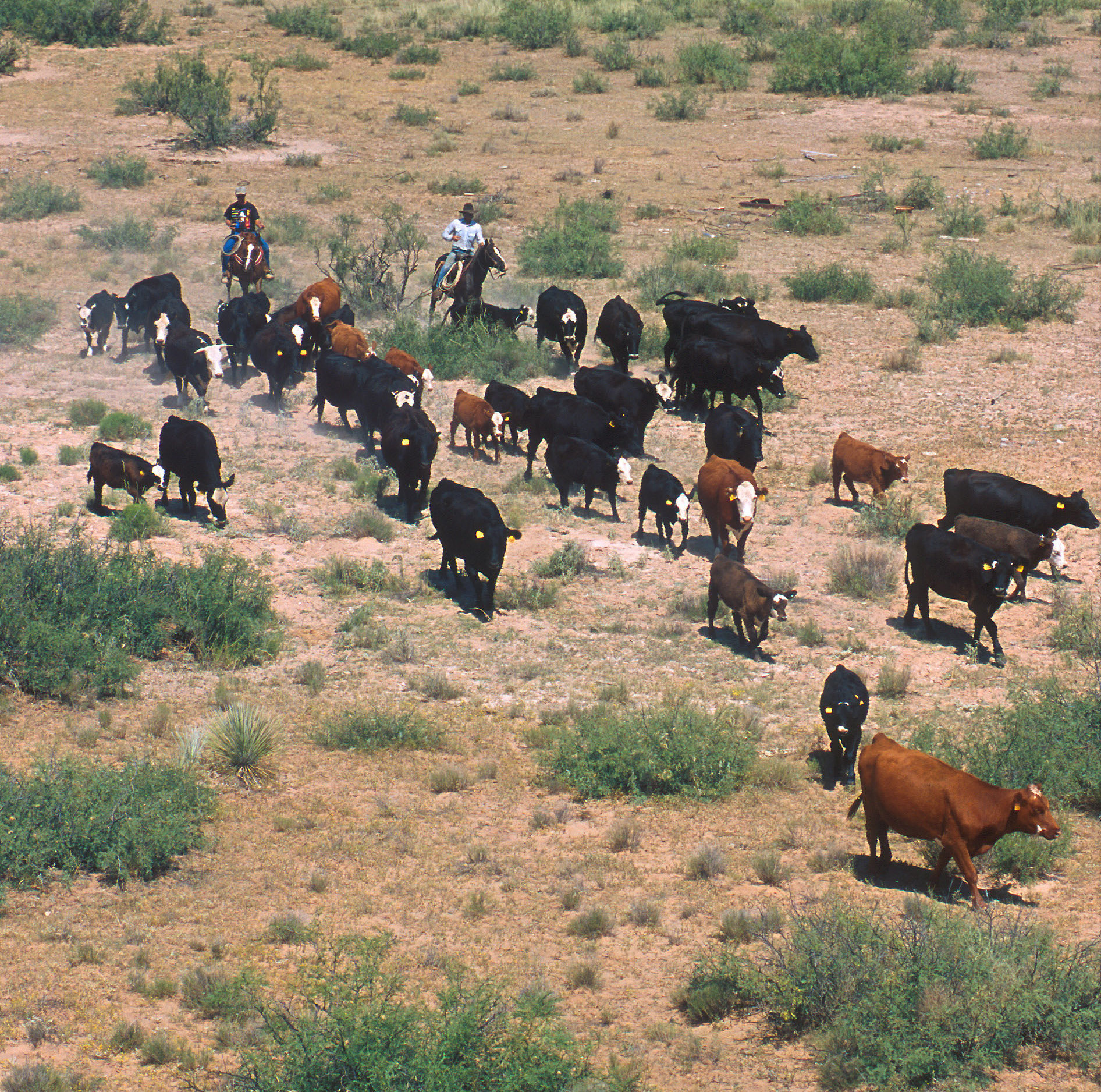
A modern small-scale cattle drive in New Mexico, U.S.

Droving is the practice of walking livestock over long distances. It is a type of herding, often associated with cattle, in which case it is a cattle drive (particularly in the US). Droving stock to market—usually on foot and often with the aid of dogs—has a very long history. An owner might entrust an agent to deliver stock to market and bring back the proceeds. There has been droving since people in cities found it necessary to source food from distant supplies.

== Description ==
Droving is the practice of moving livestock herds over long distances by walking them "on the hoof", sometimes several hundred kilometers. It was carried out by shepherds. The earliest written evidence about shepherds and their dogs dates back to the 14th century. Thousands of cattle were moved along the roads of Europe and Great Britain, and later sheep, goats, pigs and even geese and turkeys. The journey from pasture to market, slaughterhouse, or buyer could take anywhere from a few weeks to a few months. The herd moved during the day at a speed of 2–3 km per hour, and stopped at night to rest and graze. During the day, herding dogs ensured movement, made sure that the animals did not wander off, and at night they guarded the herd and the carts of the shepherd with their families from remaining predators, but mostly from hungry village dogs.

The activity of sheepherders lost its exceptional importance for the economy only in the middle of the 19th century with the development of railway transport. Since the 1960s, the automobile transportation of livestock in special trucks, which has become common, has finally replaced the commercial droving of herds. The profession of shepherd or drover is retained in some countries as a seasonal job for moving cattle and sheep to and from summer pastures.

The dogs used for droving were quite large and high-legged, tireless, aggressive and extremely independent, they did not require special training and the ability to interact with other dogs. Forcing the cattle to move in the right direction, the droving dogs treated them rather rudely, biting the cows, pushing the sheep hard with their bodies and biting them. The old droving breeds include, for example, the Bouvier of Flanders, the Rottweiler, the Greater Swiss Mountain Dog, in the UK – the Old English Sheepdog.

=== Transport to market ===
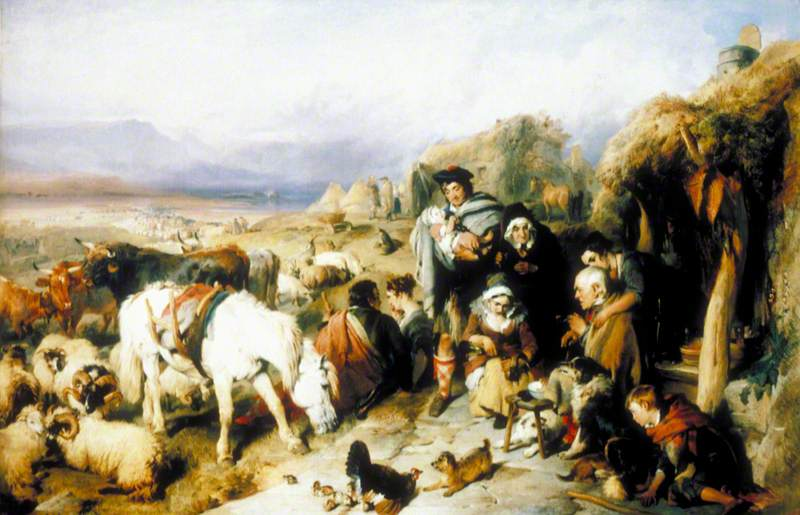
The Drover's Departure by Edwin Landseer, 1835

One individual cannot both take care of animals on a farm and take stock on a long journey to market. So the owner might entrust this stock to an agent—usually a drover—who will deliver the stock to market and bring back the proceeds. Drovers took their herds and flocks down traditional routes with organised sites for overnight shelter and fodder for men and for animals.

The journey might last from a few days to months. The animals had to be driven carefully so they would be in good condition on arrival. There would have to be prior agreement for payment for stock lost; for animals born on the journey, for sales of produce created during the journey. Until provincial banking developed, a drover returning to base would be carrying substantial sums of money. Being in a position of great trust, the drover might carry to the market town money to be banked and important letters and take with them people not familiar with the road.

Drovers might take the stock no more than a part of their journey because some stock might be sold at intervening markets to other drovers. The new drovers would finish the delivery.

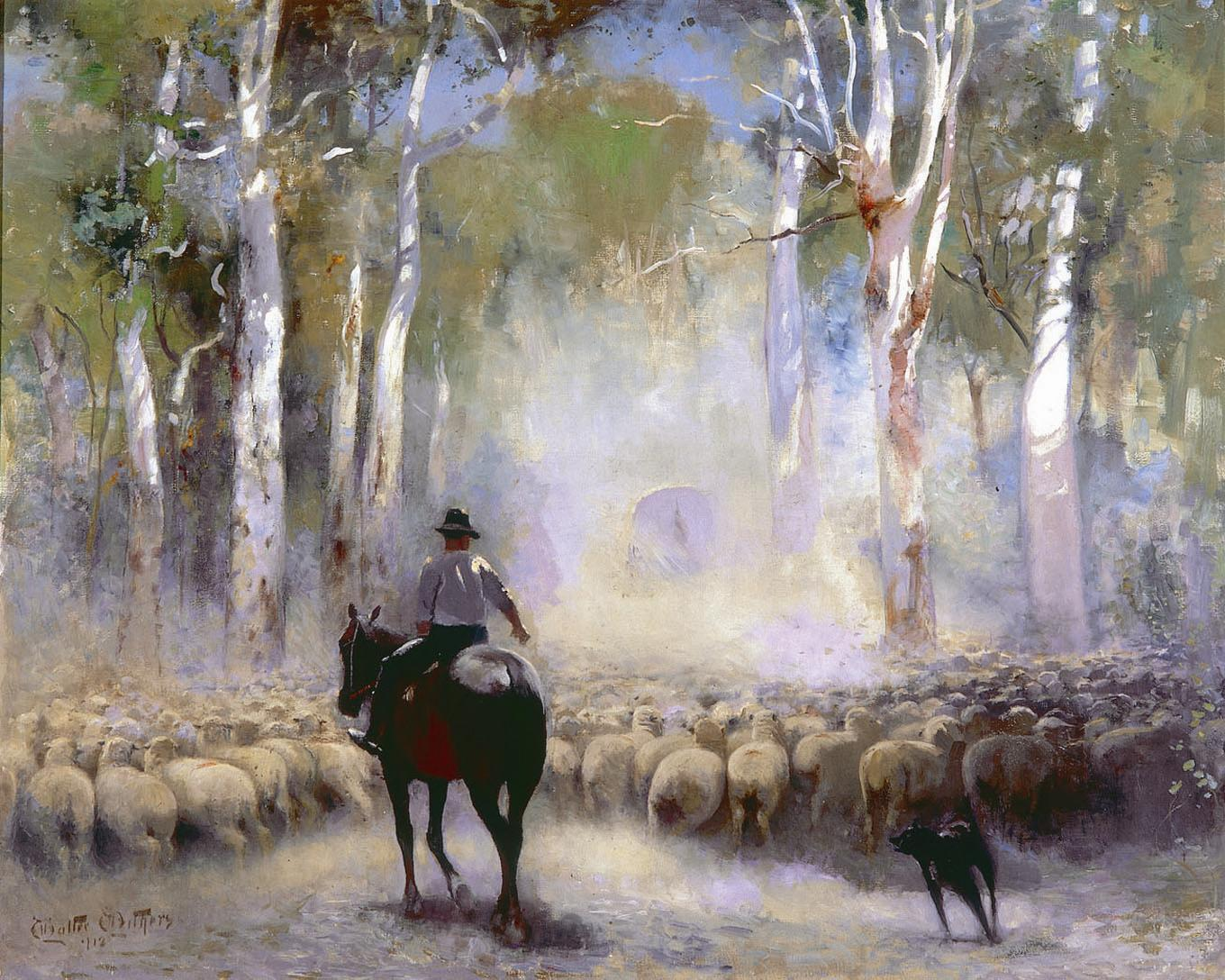
Droving in Australia

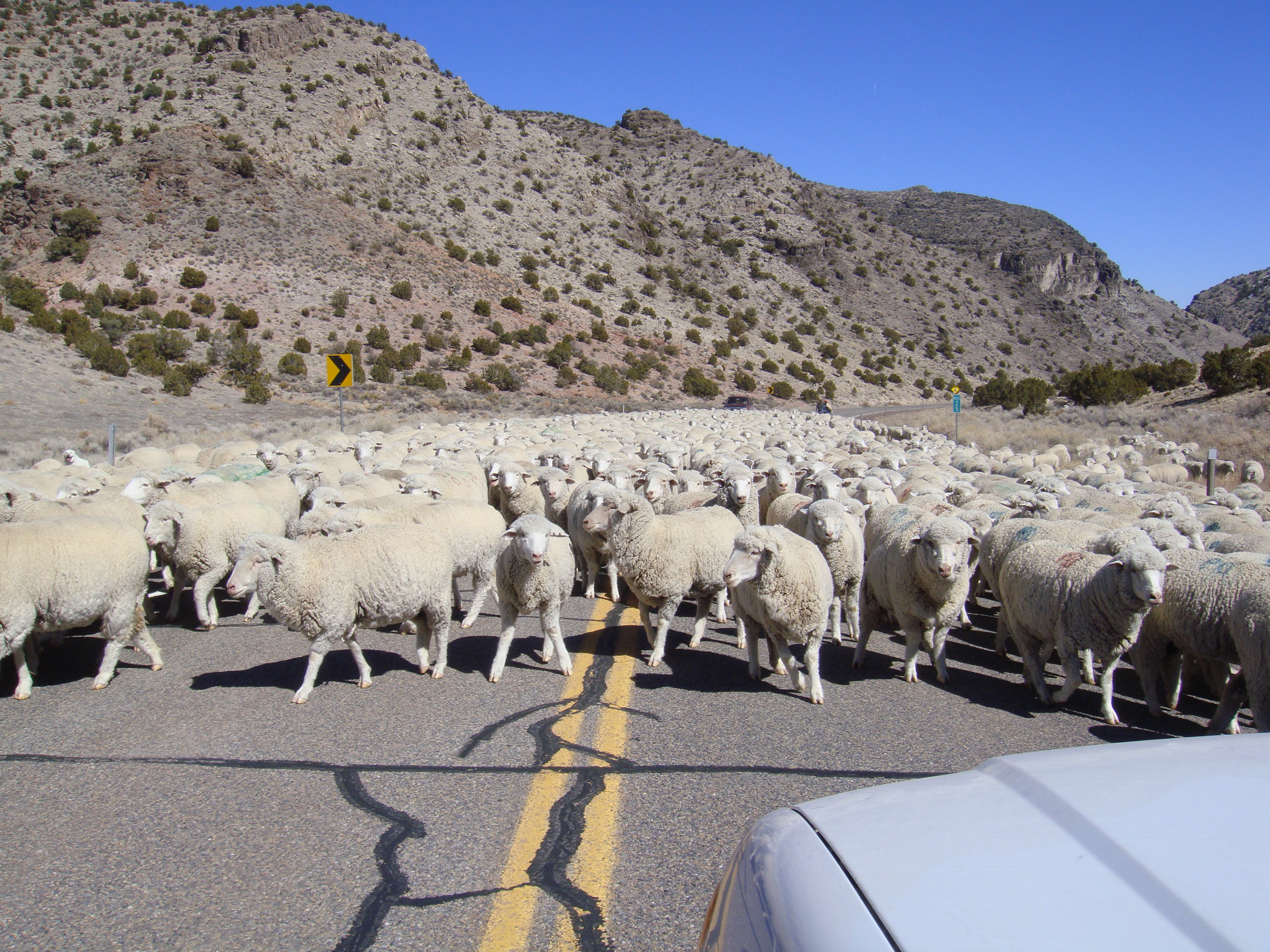
Sheep droving in Kings Canyon, Utah, U.S.

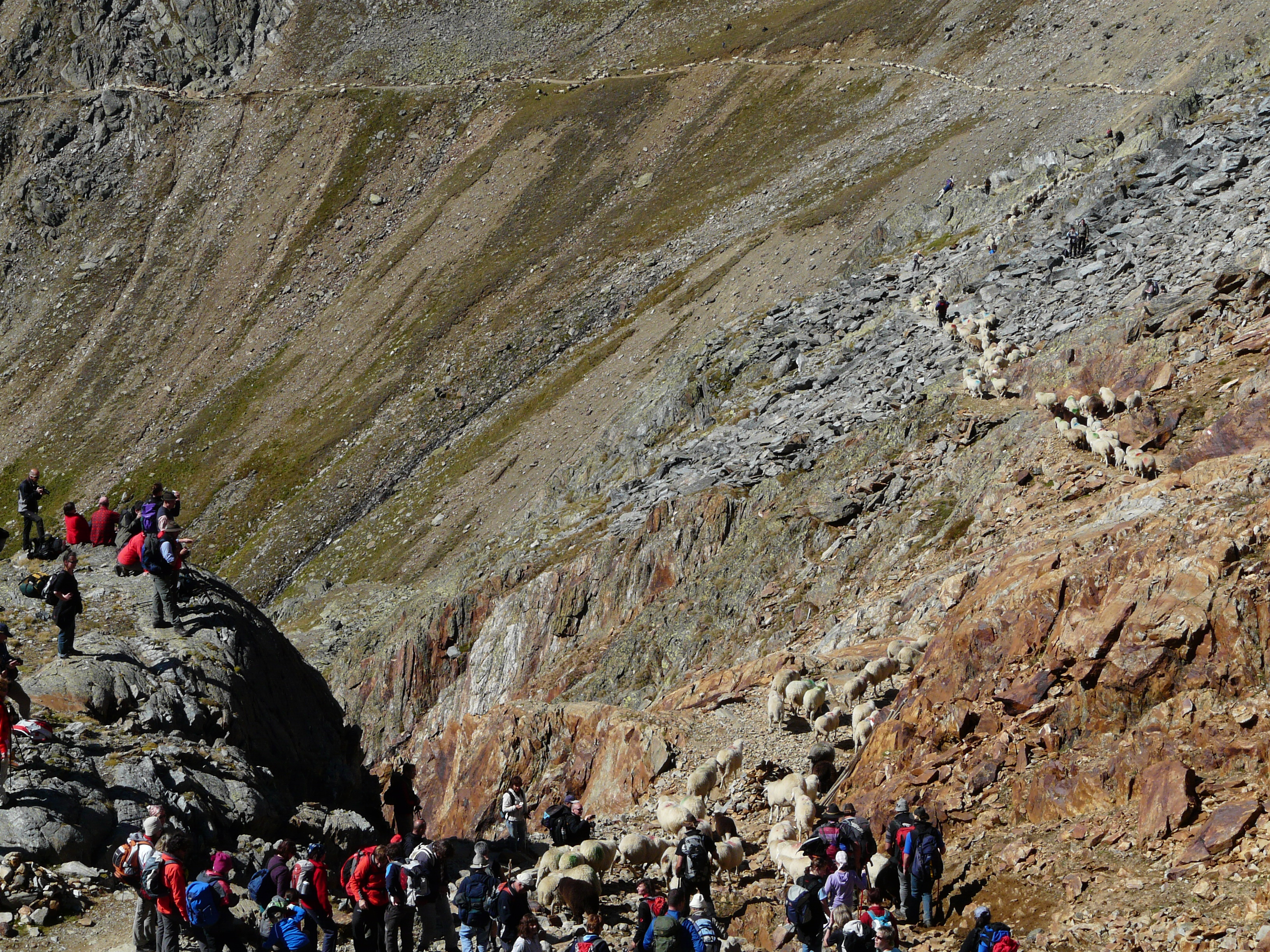
Austrian Tyrol

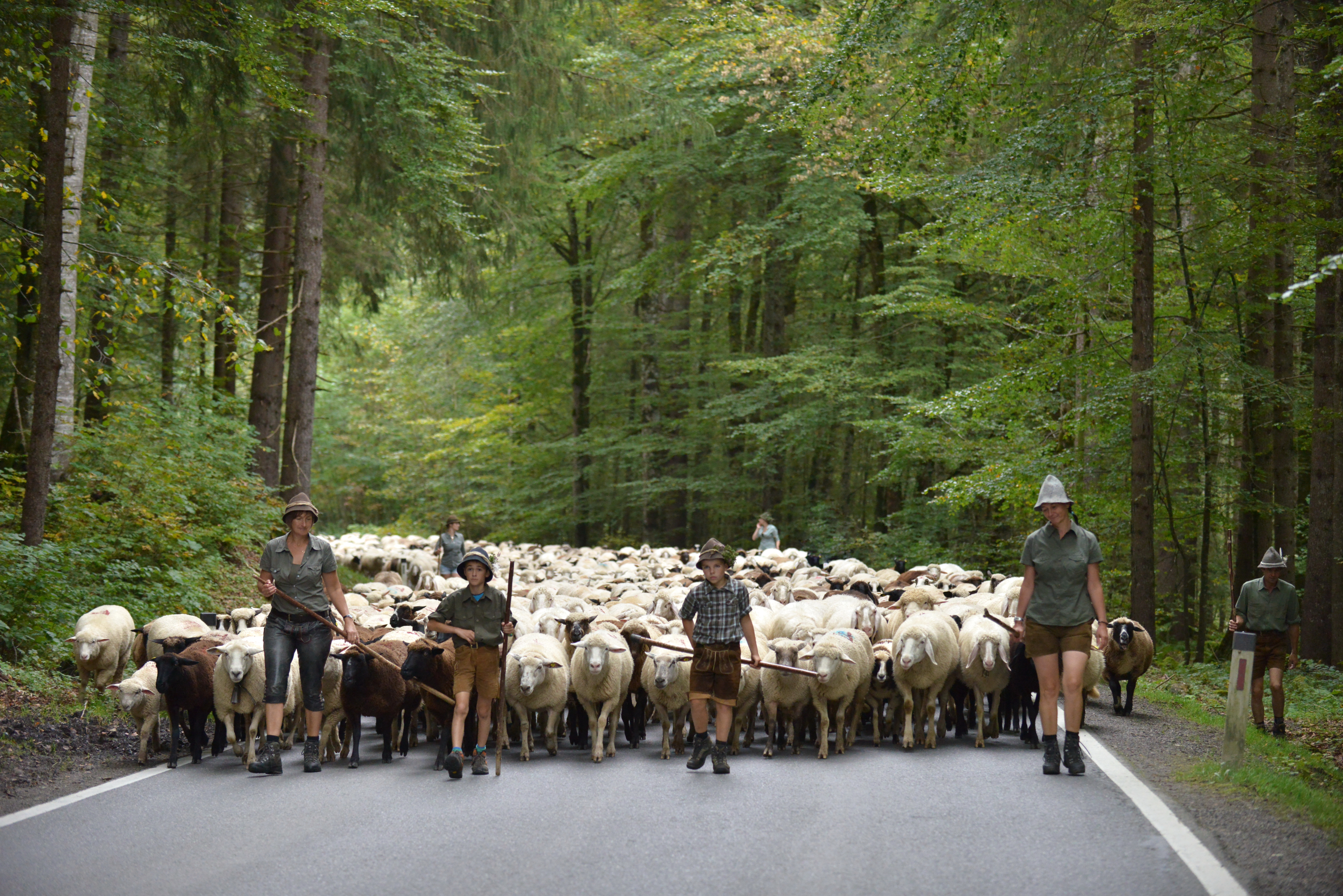
Vorarlberg, Austria

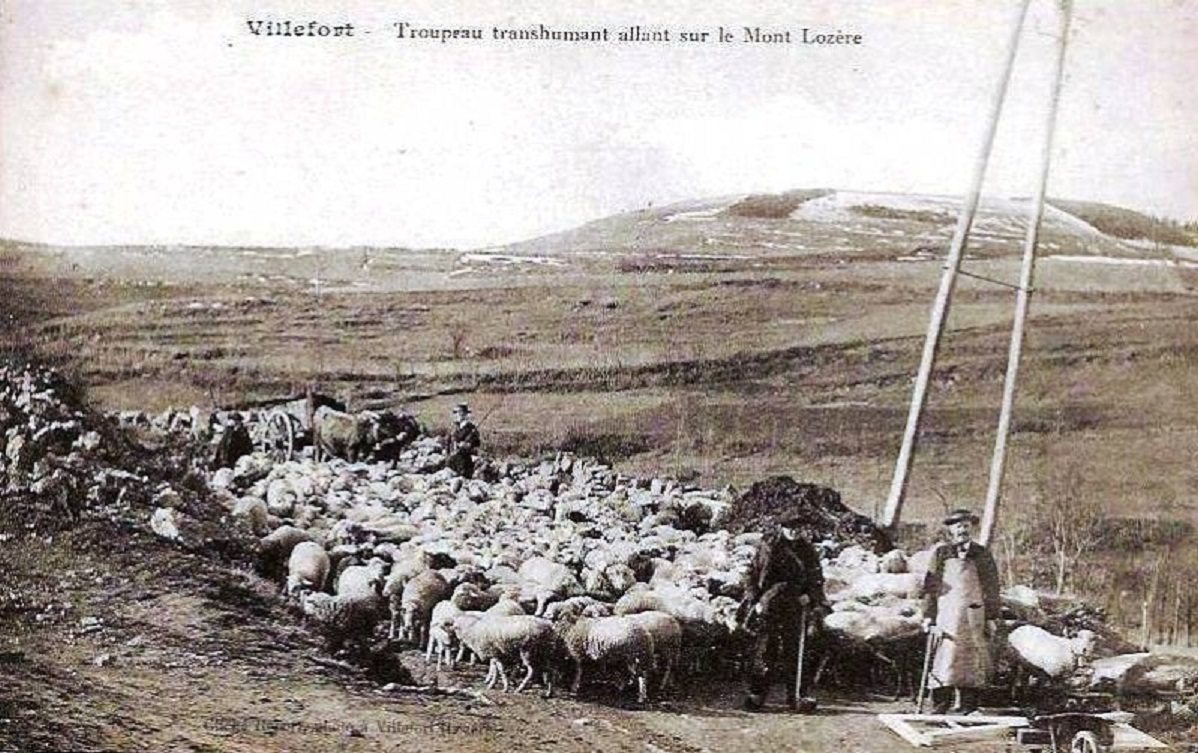
Lozère, Massif Central, France

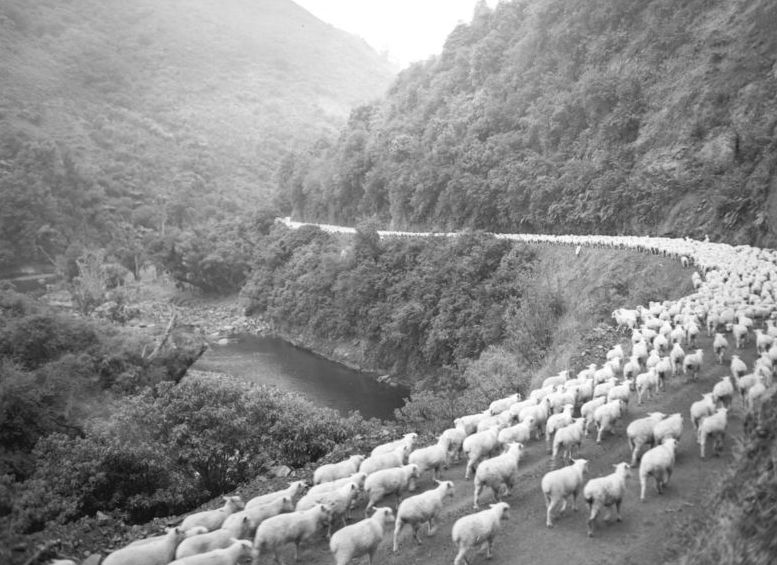
Waioeka Gorge, New Zealand

== Drovers' roads, drovers' routes or stock routes ==
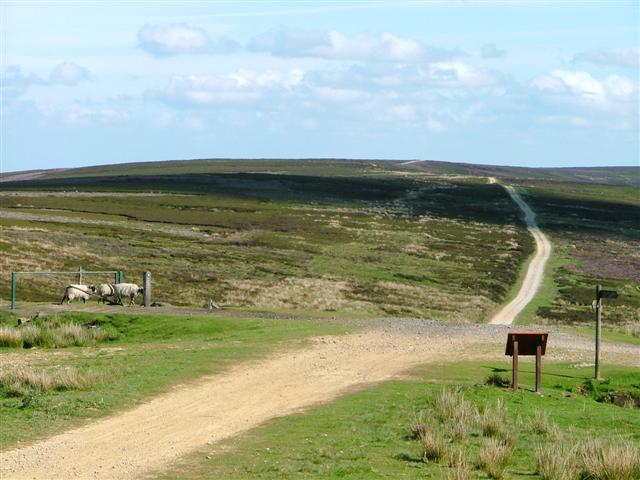
Drovers' Road, North Yorkshire

Drovers' roads were much wider than those for ordinary traffic and without any form of paving. The droving routes which still exist in Wales avoided settlements in order to save front gardens and consequential expense.

== History ==
Droving stock to market—usually on foot and often with the aid of dogs—has a very long history. There has been droving since people in cities found it necessary to source food from distant supplies.

Around 5,000 years ago the builders of Stonehenge in southwest England feasted in the Stone Age on pigs and cattle and other animals from as far as northeast Scotland, some 700 km away. Romans are said to have had drovers and their flocks following their armies to feed their soldiers.

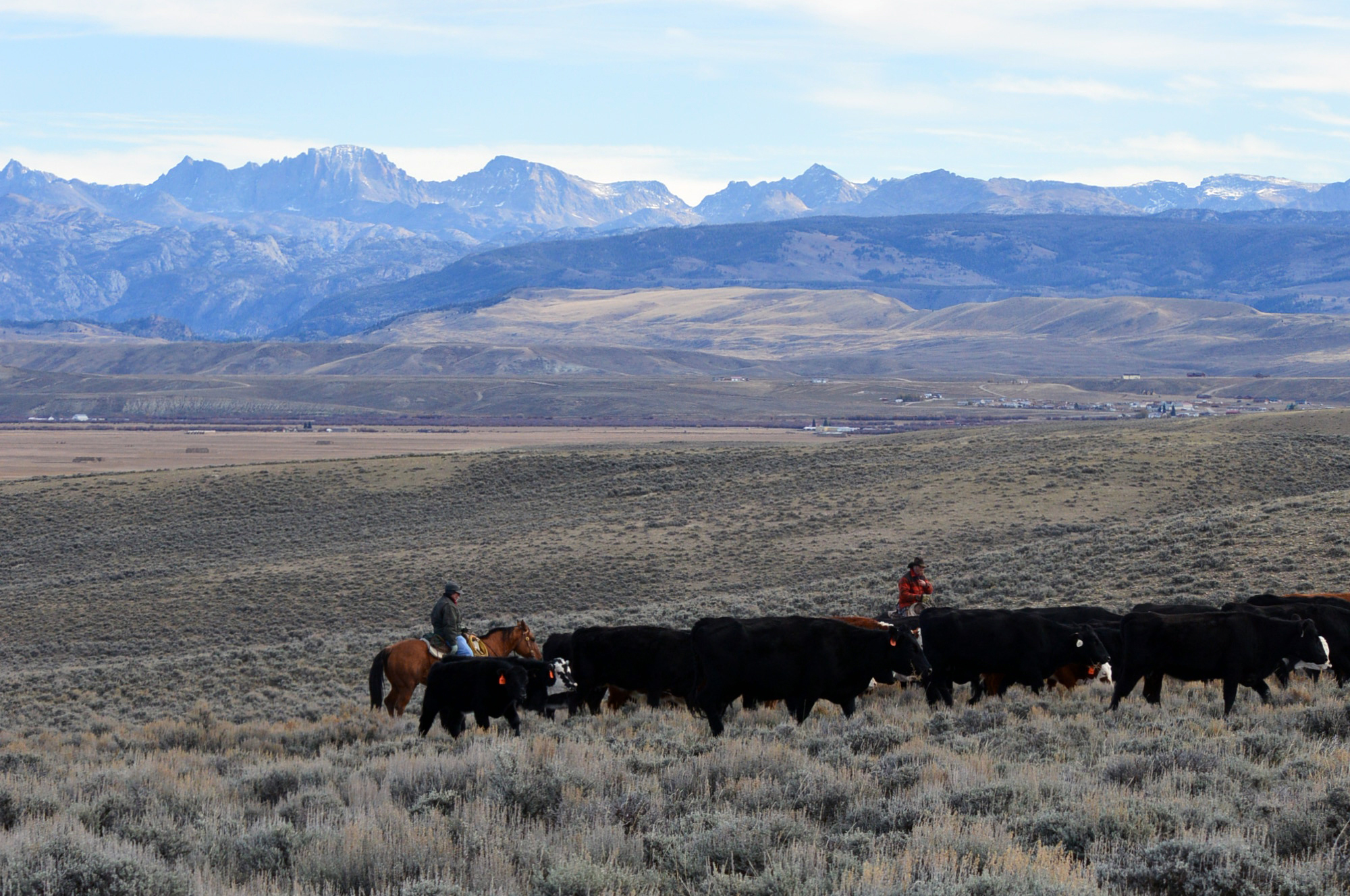
Cattle drive near Pinedale, Wyoming, U.S.

Cattle drives were an important feature of the settlement of both the western United States and of Australia. In 1866, cattle drives in the United States moved 20 million head of cattle from Texas to railheads in Kansas. In Australasia, long distance drives of sheep also took place. In these countries these drives covered great distances—800 miles (1,300 km) Texas to Kansas—with drovers on horseback, supported by wagons or packhorses. Drives continued until railways arrived. In some circumstances driving very large herds long distances remains economic.

=== Britain ===
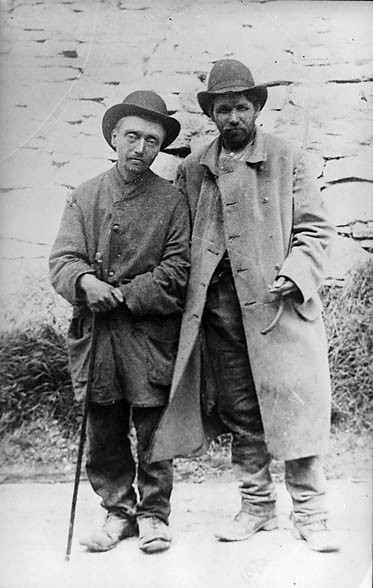
Welsh drovers c. 1880. 30,000 cattle and sheep were driven from Wales to London each year.

A weekly cattle market was founded midway between North Wales and London in Newent, Gloucestershire in 1253. In an Ordinance for the cleansing of Smythfelde dated 1372 it was agreed by the "dealers and drovers" to pay a charge per head of horse, ox, cow, sheep or swine.

Henry V brought about a lasting boom in droving in the early fifteenth century when he ordered as many cattle as possible be sent to the Cinque Ports to provision his armies in France.

An act passed by Edward VI to safeguard his subject's herds and money required drovers, from the mid-sixteenth century, to be approved and licensed by the district court or quarter sessions there proving they were of good character, married, householders and over 30 years of age. Considerable expertise meant that flocks averaging 1,500 to 2,000 head of sheep travelled 20 to 25 days from Wales to London yet lost less than four per cent of their body weight. Obliged to trek much further than from Wales, Scottish drovers would buy the cattle outright and drive them to London.

It has been estimated that by the end of the 18th century around 100,000 cattle and 750,000 sheep arrived each year at London's Smithfield market from the surrounding countryside. Railways brought an end to most droving around the middle of the 19th century.

Turkeys and geese for slaughter were also driven to London's market in droves of 300 to 1,000 birds.

Drovers also took animals to other major industrial centres in the UK (such as South Wales, the Midlands, the Manchester region).

=== Australia ===
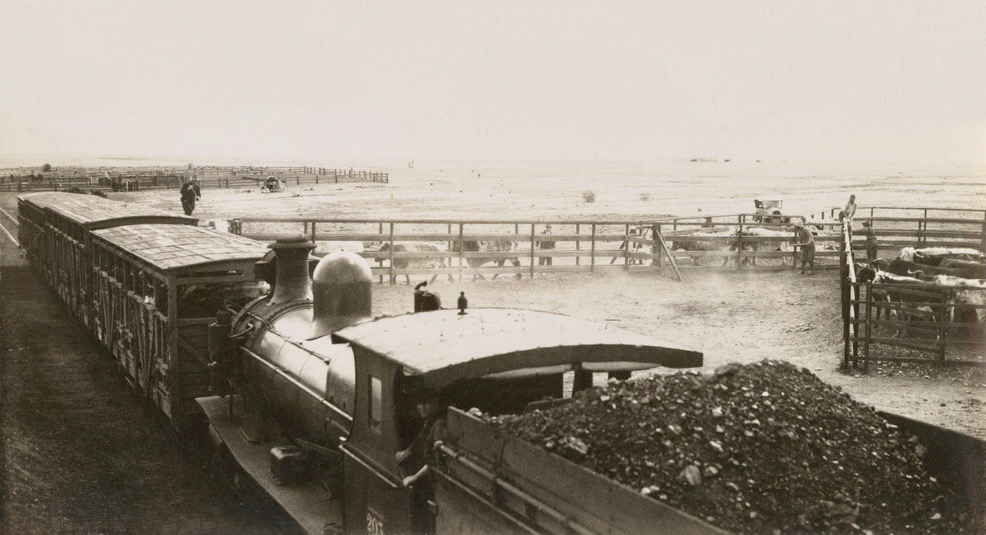
The end of distance droving in Australia. Loading railway cattle cars at Cockburn South Australia, 1932

In Australia droving was especially important during a drought in search of better feed and/or water or in search of a yard to work on the livestock. Some drovers covered very long distances, they explored the new country and were called "overlanders". These men could be on the road for over two years. Patsy Durack, for instance, left Queensland for the Kimberley in Western Australia in 1885 with 8,000 cattle, arriving with only half that number some two years and two months later, completing a drive of some 3,000 miles. Indeed, long cattle drives continued well into the latter half of the twentieth century. During long "dry stages" cattle required extra care. That sometimes meant droving in the night when the temperature would drop. The drover often relied on roadside vegetation "the long paddock" for the animals' sustenance.

The standard team of men employed to move 1,200 cattle consisted of seven men: the boss drover, four stockmen, a cook and a horse-tailer. Store cattle were moved in large stocks of up to 1500 animals. Fat bullocks bred for meat were moved in mobs of about 650 head.

=== Europe ===
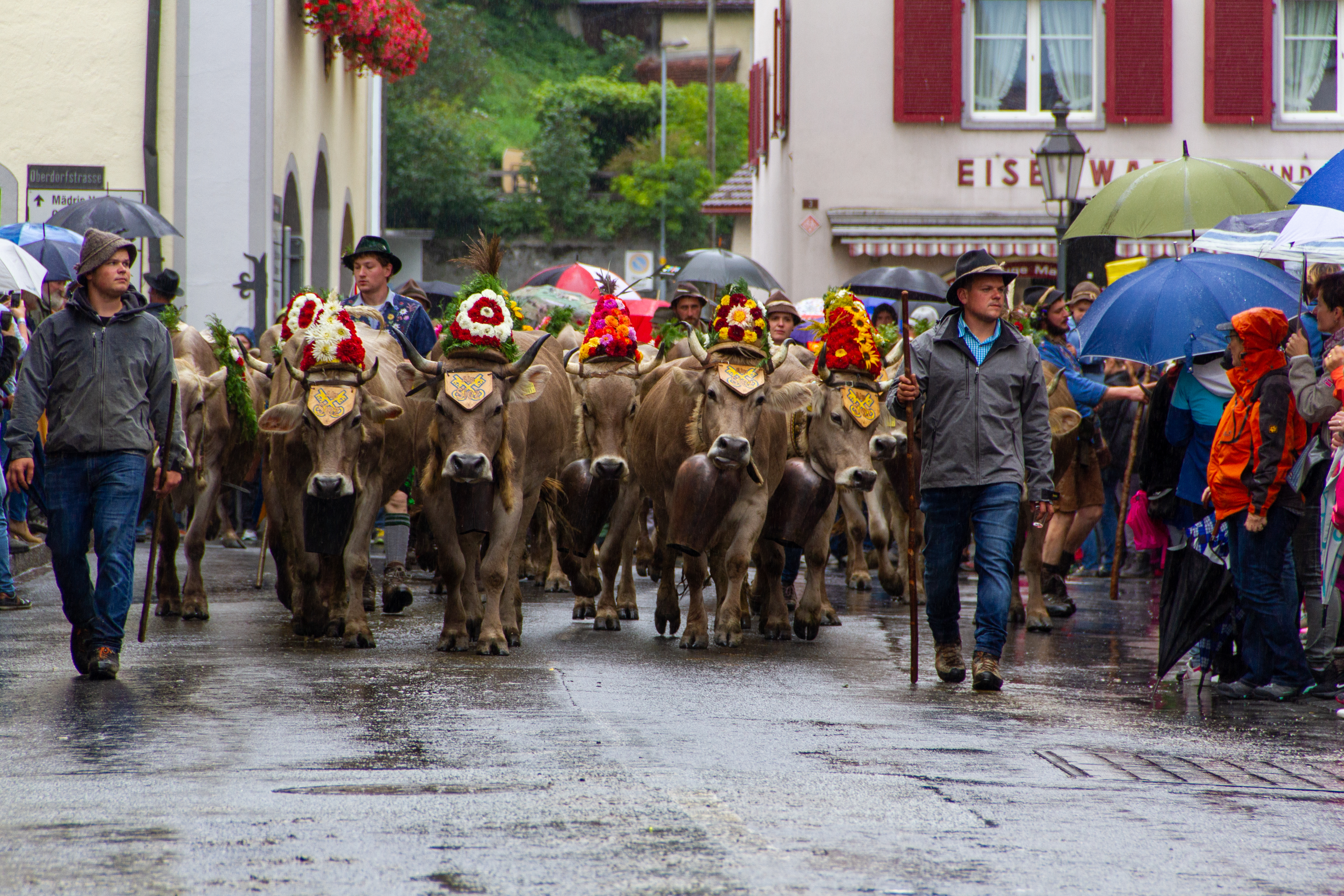
Almabtrieb at Mels in Switzerland in 2007.

In medieval central Europe, annual cattle drives brought Hungarian Grey cattle across the Danube River to the beef markets of Western Europe. In the 16th century, the Swiss operated cattle drives over the St. Gotthard Pass to the markets in Bellinzona and Lugano and into Lombardy in northern Italy. The drives had ended by 1700 when sedentary dairy farming proved more profitable. In the eighteenth century, up to 80,000 cattle were driven South from Scotland each year. From 1850, cattle trains were established from Aberdeen to London.

=== United States ===
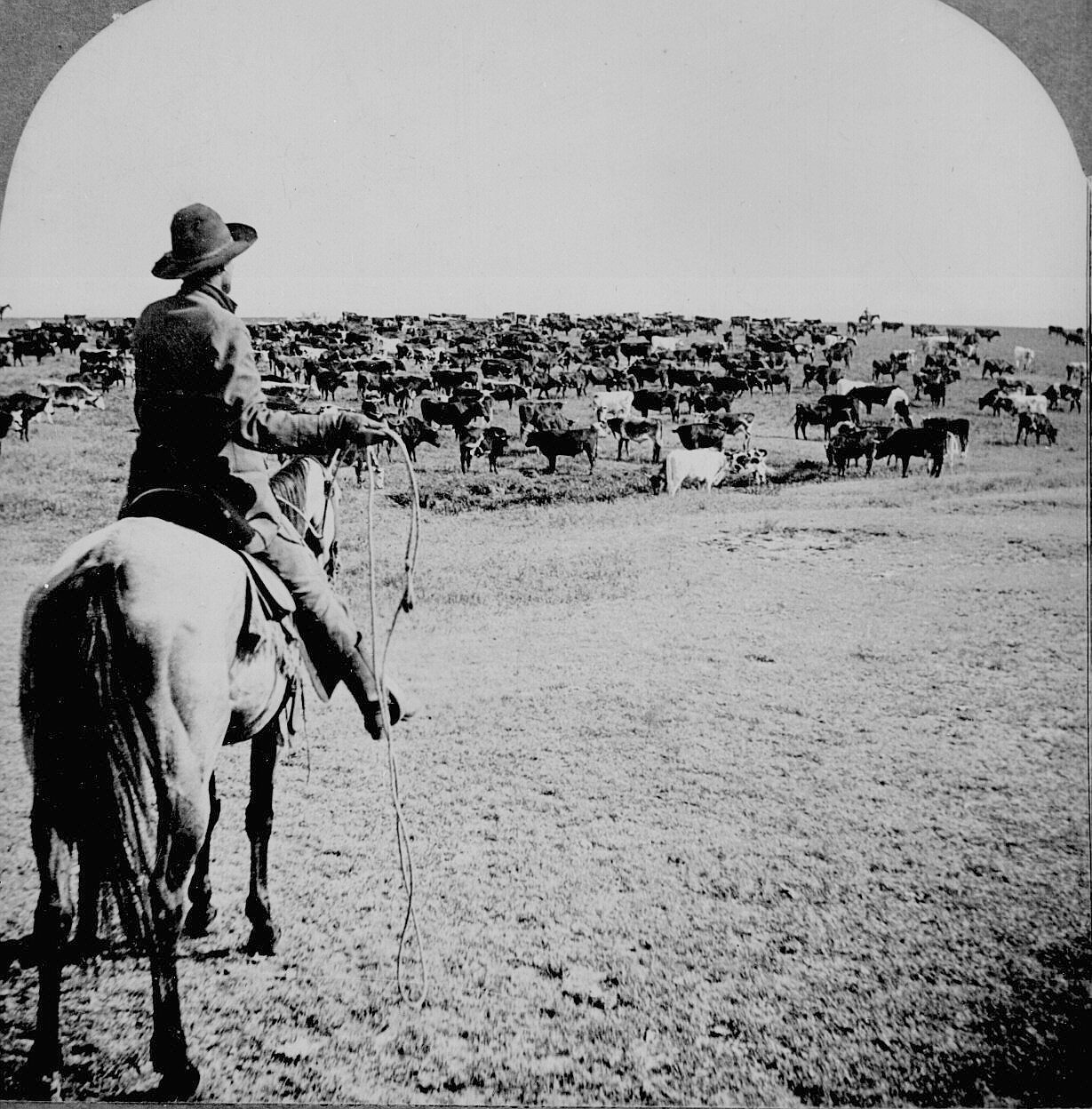
Cattle herd and cowboy, circa 1902

Cattle drives involved cowboys on horseback moving herds of cattle long distances to market. Cattle drives were at one time a major economic activity in the American West, particularly between the years 1866-1895, when 10 million cattle were herded from Texas to railheads in Kansas for shipments to stockyards in Chicago and points east. Drives usually took place in Texas on the Goodnight-Loving Trail (1866), Potter-Bacon trail (1883), Western trail (1874), Chisholm Trail (1867) and Shawnee Trail (1840s).

Due to the use of cattle drives in fiction and film, the cowboy tending to a herd of cattle has become a well known image of the American West.

=== Droving feats ===
==== British feats ====
The 18th-century English graziers of Craven Highlands, West Riding of Yorkshire, went as far as Scotland to purchase cattle stock, thence to be brought down the drove roads to their cattle-rearing district. In the summer of 1745, the celebrated Mr Birtwhistle had 20,000 head brought "on the hoof" from the northern Scotland to Great Close near Malham, a distance of over 300 miles (483 km).

==== Australian feats ====
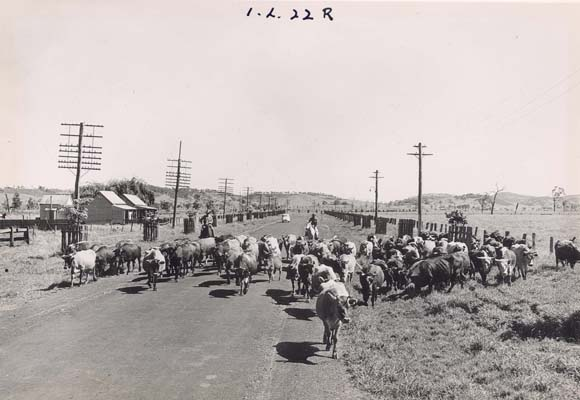
Cattle droving near Lismore, Australia

William James Browne owned Nilpena Station in the Flinders Ranges of South Australia in 1879. He contracted Alfred Giles to overland 12,000 sheep to his new properties Newcastle Waters and Delamere Stations in the Northern Territory. Of those, 8,000 sheep survived the journey.

On March 26, 1883, two Scottish/Australian families, the MacDonalds and the McKenzies, began a huge cattle drive from Clifford's Creek near Goulburn, New South Wales to the Kimberley, where they established "Fossil Downs" station. The journey of over 6,000 km lasted more than three years and involved Charles ('Charlie') MacDonald (1851–1903) and William Neil ('Willie') MacDonald (1860–1910), sons of Donald MacDonald from Broadford on the Isle of Skye (who had sailed from Scotland in the 1830s). The family moved to Clifford's Creek, Laggan, and the brothers had become expert bushmen. The cattle drive was undertaken after Donald MacDonald heard glowing reports of the Kimberley from Scots/Australian explorer Alexander Forrest in 1879. The MacDonalds and the McKenzies formed a joint venture to obtain leases in the Kimberley and to stock them by overlanding the cattle. The brothers were joined by their cousins Alexander and Donald MacKenzie, Peter Thomson, James McGeorge and Jasper Pickles. They set out with 670 cattle, 32 bullocks yoked to two wagons and 86 horses. All foodstuffs and equipment for the long journey were carried in the wagons. Drought conditions delayed progress and most of the original party, apart from Charlie and Willie MacDonald, withdrew long before Cooper's Creek was reached. Stock losses were replaced, only to be reduced again by the continued drought. Despite a grueling journey through crocodile- and mosquito-infested territory in the top end with frequent Aboriginal attacks, the cattle eventually arrived at the junction of the Margaret and Fitzroy Rivers in July 1886 and "Fossil Downs" station was established. It is the longest cattle drive in history.

The Tibbett brothers drove a flock of 30,000 ewes in the early 1890s from Wellshot Station to Roma in Queensland, a distance of over 700 kilometres (435 mi), in search of grass for the stock. The sheep were all sheared in Roma and lambing started as relieving rains came to Wellshot. The flock was brought back with an additional 3,000 lambs.

In 1900, a drover named Coleman departed from Clermont with 5,000 sheep; the country was drought-stricken and he had been instructed to keep the mob alive. Coleman wandered 5,000 miles (8,000 km) through south-western Queensland finding feed as they went. When he eventually returned he brought back 9,000 sheep, had sold over 5,000, and killed nearly 1,000 for "personal use".

In 1904, 20,000 head of cattle were removed from Wave Hill Station and overlanded to Killarney Station, near Narrabri in New South Wales, a straight-line distance of around 3,000 kilometres (1,900 mi). At the time, it was considered a "remarkable" feat of droving and took 18 months to complete.

Another famous drove was by William Philips in 1906, who overlanded 1,260 bullocks from Wave Hill Station some 3,400 kilometres (2,100 mi) to Burrendilla, near Charleville in just 32 weeks.

== See also ==
- Cattle drives in the United States
- Cowboy
- Drover (Australian)
- Drover (disambiguation)
- Drovers' road
- Gaucho
- Livestock transportation
- Ranch
- Station (Australian agriculture)
- Stock route
- Transhumance
- Tropeiro
