= Vehicle subscription =

Fee for the right to use one or more vehicles

Vehicle subscription is a service where a customer pays a recurring fee for the right to use one or more automotive vehicles. Some vehicle subscriptions offer insurance and maintenance as part of the subscription fee; other subscriptions allow the subscriber to switch between different vehicles during their subscription period. Industry commentators consider vehicle subscription to be an alternative to owning or leasing a vehicle.

Vehicle subscriptions have been available since 2010 when Rima Braden of Autosource, LLC offered a short-term flexible auto acquisition program from his dealership in Honolulu, Hawaii that he coined "Flexlease". Rebranded as "Carousel" in 2013, the program was restricted to the city and county of Honolulu and remains in operation today. In 2014 flexdrive, now jointly owned by Cox Automotive and Holman Enterprises, launched. Clutch Technologies, a start-up, launched a subscription service for consumers in Atlanta in mid-2014; Flow Automotive Companies was the first automotive dealership to offer a subscription service, launching Drive Flow in Winston-Salem in 2016, using Clutch's technology platform. 2017 saw several automotive manufacturers announce and launch subscription services, including Book by Cadillac, Porsche Passport, Care by Volvo and Canvas (backed by Ford Motor Company). By 2018, a number of startups and automotive dealership companies had launched subscriptions in multiple markets and flexdrive became the first U.S.-based car subscription company to support dealerships and fleet operators stateside and globally through its partnership with Dribe in Denmark.

== Definition ==
Vehicle subscriptions are a type of subscription business model where a customer pays a periodic fee for the use of one or more vehicles. The difference between a vehicle subscription and buying a vehicle is that the subscription service retains ownership of the vehicle. While vehicle subscriptions and traditional automotive leases both involve recurring payments, many subscription services offer more flexibility in terms of minimum term and the ability to swap between vehicles. The main difference between vehicle subscriptions and vehicle or car rental is that most subscriptions are designed to offer full-time possession of a vehicle such that the subscription replaces the customer's primary vehicle, whereas rental involves the effort of procuring vehicles for specific dates or trips.

Vehicle subscriptions have been variously been identified as part of the "sharing economy" or part of the "subscription economy". Vehicle subscriptions have also been classified as a form of "transportation-as-a-service" and as a form of "mobility-as-a-service".

== Common features ==
Edmunds.com observes that there is a wide variety in the types of vehicle subscriptions that are available, such that many different customer needs can be met across the various services. Most vehicle subscriptions allow customers to pay a flat periodic fee, typically on a monthly basis. Whereas some subscription offerings have no minimum term (e.g., Book by Cadillac), others do have a minimum term (e.g., Care by Volvo launched with a two-year minimum term). Vehicle subscriptions include flat-rate, no-haggle pricing. Prospective customers typically sign-up using an app. The monthly fee may include insurance, maintenance and roadside assistance. Some services include a mileage limit and some offer unlimited mileage. Several services, such as Carousel, Porsche Passport and Book by Cadillac, offer the option to swap between different types of vehicles. Some services offer unlimited swaps and some restrict the number of swaps.

== Types of providers and business models ==
Vehicle subscriptions are offered by several different categories of company. Each category is pursuing a slightly different business model.

=== Automotive manufacturers ===
Several automotive manufacturers and brands offer or have announced vehicle subscriptions, including Porsche, Volvo, Cadillac, Hyundai, Mercedes-Benz, BMW, Lexus and Ford. These services offer subscribers vehicles from a single brand or, in the case of Volvo, a single vehicle. While initial launches have tended to focus on one or two cities, there is evidence that the manufacturers will eventually offer their services more broadly: for example Care by Volvo was immediately available across the country and Book by Cadillac has expanded beyond its original launch market of New York City.

The manufacturers have announced various objectives for these programs. Volvo has described the objective of Care by Volvo as to provide convenience by offering access, insurance, maintenance and support within a single package. Cadillac has described the objective of Book by Cadillac as being to grow the number of Cadillac drivers, particularly those who are new to the brand. Porsche has described their Passport service as a way to cater to customers with highly varied lives. Ford has described Canvas as a way to grow the number of Ford drivers while also controlling the number of used vehicles hitting automotive auctions.

=== Automotive dealerships ===
A number of automotive dealerships have launched vehicle subscriptions focused on the markets where they have stores. The services offered by these dealerships typically include vehicles from several different brands offered by their stores, allowing customers to drive a wide variety of vehicles. Examples:

- Park Place Select in Dallas

=== Start-ups and corporate-backed ventures ===
A large number of start-ups have been created to offer vehicle subscription services. One early pioneer in the vehicle subscription space was Joule. Other USA-based start-ups include Go, Carma, Flexcar, Borrow, and Mobiliti. Several vehicle subscription start-ups have been founded in Europe, including Wagonex, Cocoon Vehicles and Drover, from the United Kingdom, and Dribe and Bilabonnement, both from Denmark. A UK based startup, Elmo, focuses on a subscription service exclusively for electric vehicles. In 2017, Gurgaon based startup Revv Cars, launched monthly multi-brand car subscription program Switch across 15 cities in India.

In 2018, another Indian company was launched. Myles Automotive Technologies (Delhi-based) is a multi-brand car subscription brand operating in all metropolitan cities.

Several established companies have created new business units that are offering vehicle subscriptions. In the US, Cox Enterprises launched flexdrive. In Europe, LeasePlan, a vehicle leasing company, will offer subscriptions with their CarNext.com platform.

VAI, a brazilian subscription service for ride-sharing drivers was founded in December 2017 in Sao Paulo.

The German company like2drive GmbH was founded in February 2018 as part of the Fleetpool Group.

Cluno, a multi-brand car subscription service operating in Germany, was founded in October 2017.

A car subscription service in Czech Republic, called Driveto Klub, was launched in October 2018 by Driveto. Driveto was founded in Prague in 2017 and started as an online aggregator of operating lease offers. The majority of the start-up is owned by Miton, an online investment group from Jablonec nad Nisou.

Australia's car subscription services include Carbar, HelloCars and Carly, all of which were launched in early 2019. As registered Victorian and NSW motor dealers, Carbar and HelloCars subscription vehicles are owned and operated by their respective companies while Carly utilises peer-to-peer customer vehicles offered in partnership with sister company DriveMyCar Rentals Pty Ltd. In addition to retail car subscription providers, the Australian market has also seen the launch of Loopit, a software platform enabling OEMs, dealerships and rental car companies to launch and manage their own car subscription product.

A pioneer in the Swiss vehicle subscription market is Carvolution AG, launched in 2018, supported a 50 million CHF investment by the insurance group Die Mobiliar Versicherungsgesellschaft AG In partnerships with Mobilezone Holding AG and LIDL, the start-up holds around 80% of the market share.

CARIFY, with the largest selection of cars of similar ventures in Switzerland, was founded in September 2019 by Sergio Studer and Raffael Fiechter.

Vehicle subscription has also begun to flourish in the Middle East, with Invygo launching the region's first car subscription app in March 2019.

=== Car subscription software providers ===
Loopit (formerly Blinker Subscription) was launched in Australia in August 2019 and provides car subscription software to automotive manufacturers, car dealerships, car subscription companies and other related businesses to operate their own vehicle subscription service. During the COVID-19 pandemic, Loopit experienced a 52% increase in enquiries from car dealerships looking to introduce a car subscription model during the shutdown.
