= Christopher Poole =

American internet entrepreneur (born 1980s)

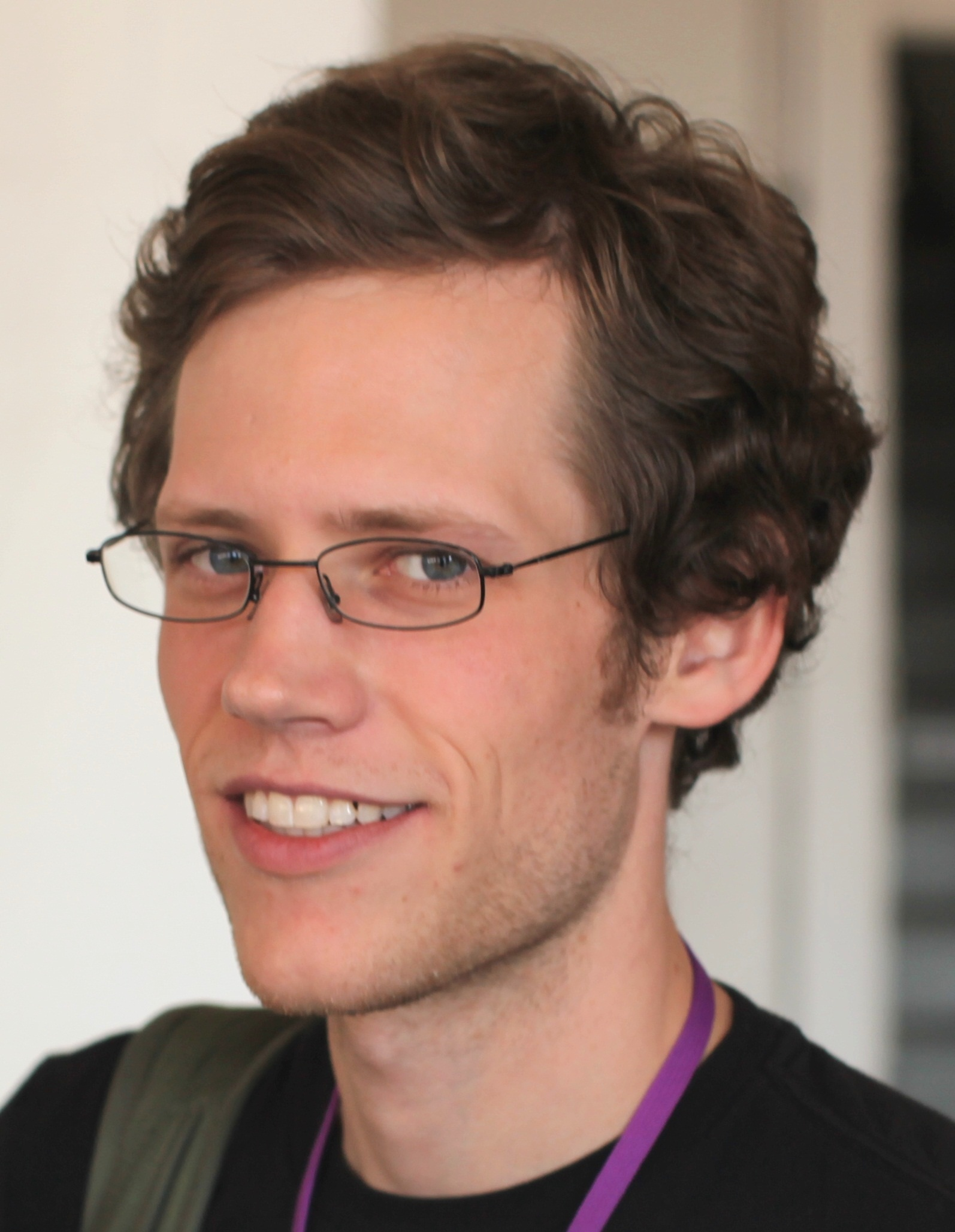
- Poole in 2012
- Born: 1987 or 1988 (age 38–39); New York City, U.S.
- Other name: moot
- Education: Virginia Commonwealth University (no degree)
- Occupations: Entrepreneur, former Google employee
- Known for: Founder and former head administrator of 4chan

Christopher Poole (born 1987 or 1988), also known online as moot, is an American Internet entrepreneur and developer. He founded the anonymous English-language imageboard 4chan in October 2003 when he was a teenager and served as the site's head administrator until January 2015. He also founded the online community Canvas Networks, active from 2011 to 2014. Poole was hired by Google in 2016 to work on Google+ and serve as a product manager. He left the company in 2021.

== Personal life ==
Christopher Poole was born in 1987 or 1988 in New York City. As a teenager, he was a member of the Something Awful forum, and frequented the anonymous Japanese textboard 2channel and its offshoot 2chan. In 2009, he attended Virginia Commonwealth University for a few semesters before dropping out. He lived with his mother while trying to monetize 4chan.

Until 2008, when his name was revealed in The Wall Street Journal, Poole took great lengths to protect his identity, going under the pseudonym Robert "Bob" Bopkins in real life and "moot" online. Several journalists, including Lev Grossman of Time and Monica Hesse of The Washington Post, noted that the name "Christopher Poole" could itself be a pseudonym.

Poole believes in anonymity on the Internet, and spoke at the TED2010 conference in Long Beach, California, about the value of the concept. In a MIT Technology Review piece entitled "Radical Opacity", Poole was described as being the antithesis of the Meta founder Mark Zuckerberg; while Zuckerberg is outspoken towards his advocacy for a transparent Internet, Poole advocates for a more opaque Internet.

== Career ==
=== 4chan ===
Poole established 4chan on October 1, 2003, using translated source code from 2chan, and sought to combine the anime culture on 2chan with the community on Something Awful. At the time, he was living with his parents in Westchester County, New York, and attending high school upstate.

In April 2009, Poole was voted the most influential person of 2008 with 16,794,368 votes by an open Internet poll conducted by Time, beating out the likes of Barack Obama, Vladimir Putin, and Oprah Winfrey. It was soon discovered that the users of the /b/ board had manipulated the results of the poll in Poole's favor. Several tools were developed to achieve this, including a website that would vote for Poole at a rate of about 100 votes per minute, and a program capable of voting for him at a rate of 300 votes per minute. The other entries in the poll were also manipulated; the first letter of each entry in the poll spelled out an acrostic for "Marblecake, also the game", a reference to the IRC chatroom where Project Chanology was born and The Game, respectively.

In April 2010, Poole gave testimony in the Sarah Palin email hacking trial, United States of America v. David Kernell. As a government witness, he explained the terminology on the site as part of his testimony, including "OP" and "lurker".

In October 2011, Jeffrey Epstein associate and former Gates Foundation advisor Boris Nikolic suggested to Epstein that he should meet with Poole, saying "the potential for manipulation is huge". Epstein responded in an e-mail that he "liked mmot [sic] a lot". That same day, Poole created the political discussion board /pol/. He also added the boards "/hc/" (Hardcore Porn), "/diy/" (Do It Yourself) and re-introduced the "/r9k/" board, which has been used as a forum for those in the incel culture.

In February 2026, following a batch of Epstein files disclosures, Poole responded to speculation that Epstein influenced the creation of /pol/. The board was created within 24 hours of his meeting with Epstein, based on timestamps in the files. Poole said:

Epstein had nothing to do with the reintroduction of a politics board to 4chan, nor anything else related to the site. The decision to add the board was made weeks beforehand, and the board was added almost 24 hours prior to a first, chance encounter at a social event. His assistant reached out to me afterward, and I met with him one time for an unmemorable lunch meeting. This happened at a time when I was meeting hundreds of people a month while speaking and networking at tech events. I did not meet him again nor maintain contact. I regret having ever encountered him at all, and have deep sympathy for all of his victims.

=== Canvas ===
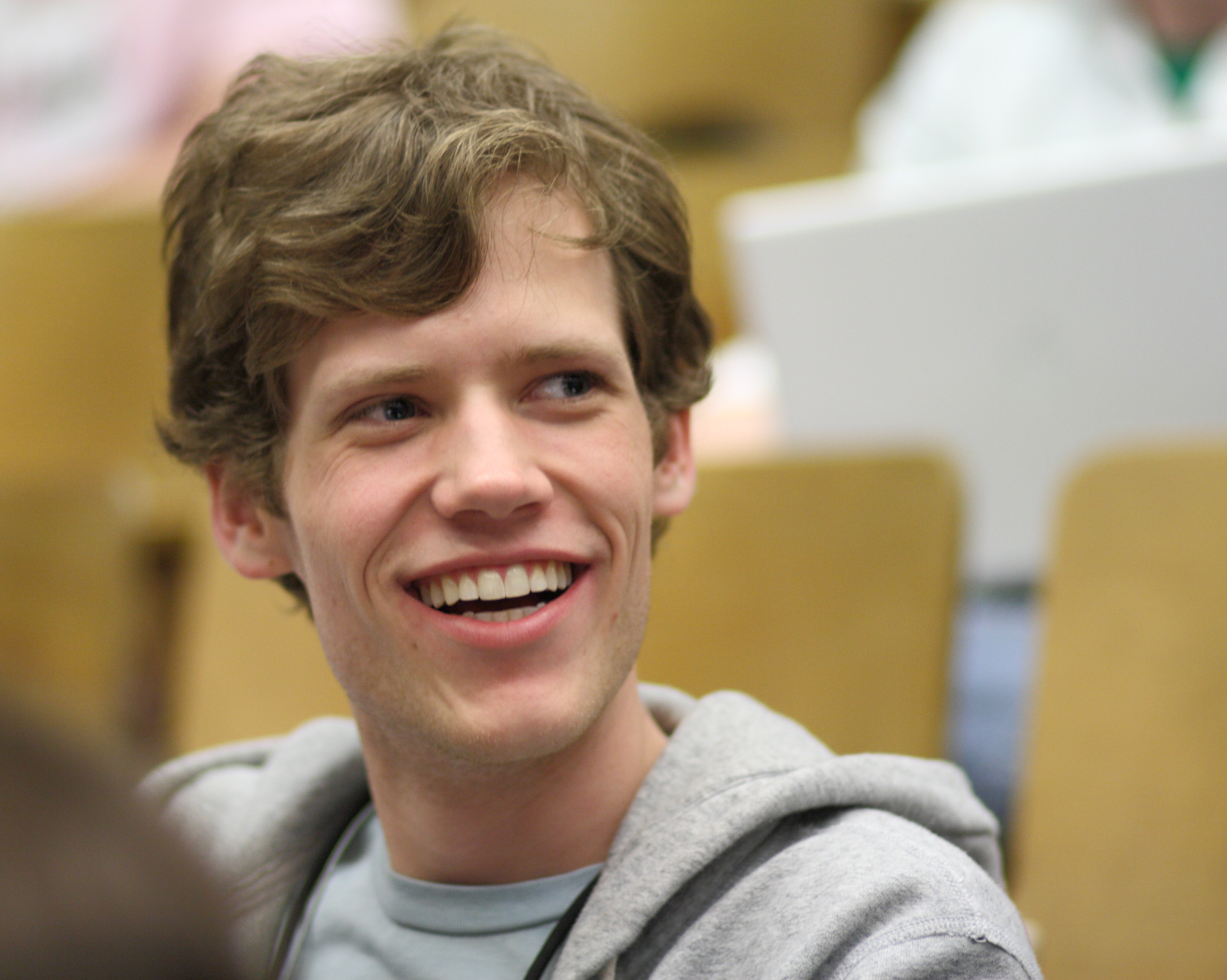
Poole at ROFLCon II in May 2010

In 2010, it was reported that Poole had raised $625,000 to create a new online enterprise, Canvas. Among the site's investors were Marc Andreessen and Joshua Schachter. Canvas officially launched on January 31, 2011, in beta, and featured digitally modified images created by users of the site. In contrast to 4chan, users were required to identify themselves using Facebook Connect. A similar app, called DrawQuest, launched on February 8, 2013.

On January 21, 2014, Poole announced that, effective immediately, Canvas and DrawQuest were shutting down.

=== Post-4chan ===
On January 21, 2015, Poole stepped down as the head administrator of 4chan. Two days later, he held his final 4chan Q&A. Following his departure from 4chan, he began to turn the site over to three anonymous 4chan moderators while looking for a buyer for the website. On September 21, 2015, Hiroyuki Nishimura, the founder of 2channel, took over as the site's owner.

On March 8, 2016, via a post on Tumblr, Poole announced that he had been hired by Google in an undisclosed position, a decision that was met with anger from Google employees. Google's hiring of Poole was seen as endorsing the doxing, harassment, and hate speech perpetrated by 4chan's users. In June 2016, Poole became a partner at Google's in-house startup incubator, Area 120. He switched positions again in 2018 when he became a product manager for Google Maps. On April 13, 2021, he left Google, after five years at the company.
