= Drove chisel =

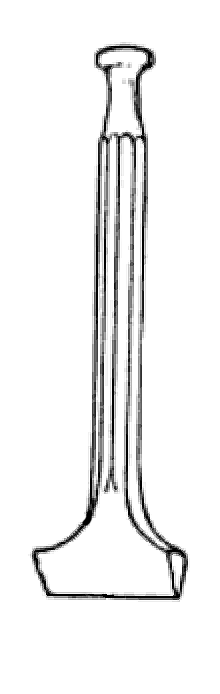
Drove chisel circa 1919

A drove chisel is a tool used by stonemasons for smoothing off roughly finished stones. When first cut from the quarry, stones are frequently have large grooves, droves, left from the splitting process. The droving chisel is used for the next stage, making the surface of the stone flat enough to use. The drove chisel is used for softer rocks such as limestone and marble, while harder rock such as granite requires a point-toothed chisel.
