= Canvas (car company) =

American vehicle subscription company

- Company type: Subsidiary
- Industry: Transportation
- Founded: December 2016
- Defunct: September 2019
- Fate: Acquired by Fair Technologies
- Headquarters: San Francisco, California
- Area served: San Francisco Bay Area, Los Angeles
- Key people: Ned Ryan (founder, CEO)
- Services: Vehicle subscription of Ford and Lincoln cars
- Parent: Ford Motor Credit Company
- Website: drivecanvas.com

Canvas was a vehicle subscription company based in San Francisco, California, for Ford and Lincoln cars. The company was a subsidiary of the Ford Motor Credit Company. Canvas was acquired by Fair, another vehicle subscription company, in September 2019. Canvas was directed at consumers seeking alternatives to car ownership and leasing or daily car rental. For a subscription term of three months to a year or longer, the service provided the use of a car bundled with insurance and maintenance coverage.

== History ==
Canvas was founded in December 2016 under founder and CEO Ned Ryan as a subsidiary of the Ford Motor Credit Company. The company launched operations in May 2017 in the San Francisco Bay Area. In November 2017, Canvas expanded to the Los Angeles market.

== Operation ==
Canvas offered previously-leased Ford and Lincoln models for 3 to 12 month subscriptions. As of September 2018, subscription costs ranged from $379 per month for a Ford subcompact to $1,125 per month for a Lincoln luxury SUV. The bundled monthly subscription included insurance, warranty, maintenance and roadside assistance.
