= Canvas 2: Akane-iro no Palette =

2004 video game

- Canvas 2 DVD Edition cover art

Canvas2 〜茜色のパレット〜 (Canvas 2: Akane-iro no Paretto)
- Genre: Romance
- Manga

Canvas 2: Extra Season
- Written by: F&C FC01
- Illustrated by: Miki Kodama
- Published by: Kadokawa Shoten
- Magazine: Ace Momogumi; Monthly Shōnen Ace
- Original run: March 2004 – December 2004
- Volumes: 1
- Video game
- Developer: F&C FC01
- Publisher: F&C (Windows, iOS); Kadokawa Shoten (PS2); AiCherry (DVDPG)
- Genre: Eroge, visual novel
- Platform: Windows, PlayStation 2, DVD game, iOS
- Released: JP: April 23, 2004 (Windows)
- Light novel
- Written by: Izumi Okazaki
- Illustrated by: Fumio
- Published by: Enterbrain
- Published: July 20, 2004
- Manga

Canvas 2: Niji-iro no Sketch
- Written by: F&C FC01
- Illustrated by: Miki Kodama
- Published by: Kadokawa Shoten
- Magazine: Monthly Shōnen Ace; Comp Ace
- Original run: April 2005 – September 2006
- Volumes: 4
- Anime television series

Canvas 2: Niji-iro no Sketch
- Directed by: Itsuro Kawasaki
- Written by: Reiko Yoshida
- Studio: Zexcs
- Licensed by: NA: Crunchyroll
- Original network: Chiba TV, TV Saitama, TV Kanagawa, KBS Kyoto, Sun TV, TV Aichi
- Original run: October 2, 2005 – March 26, 2006
- Episodes: 24
- Light novel

Canvas 2: Niji-iro no Sketch
- Written by: Tohru Tamegai
- Illustrated by: Naru Nanao; Miki Kodama
- Published by: Kadokawa Shoten
- Original run: December 22, 2005 – March 24, 2006
- Volumes: 2

Canvas 2: Akane-iro no Palette (Canvas2 〜茜色のパレット〜, Canvas 2: Akane-iro no Paretto; lit. Canvas 2: Deep Red-colored Palette) is a Japanese adult visual novel developed by F&C FC01, a brand of F&C. The game, which is a sequel to Canvas: Sepia-iro no Motif, was released for Windows on April 23, 2004; a PlayStation 2 version without adult content was released on January 26, 2006. The story follows Hiroki Kamikura, an art teacher at Nadeshiko Academy who lost his passion for painting. Hiroki's budding relationships with the game's main heroines are the focal point of the story.

The gameplay in Canvas 2 is mostly spent reading the dialogue and narrative, and the primary objective of the game is to romance the five main heroines, each of whom has her own story route that the player can explore individually. The game was ranked as the second best-selling bishōjo game at the time of its release. Canvas 2 has been adapted into various other forms of media, such as manga, light novels, audio drama, and a twenty-four-episode anime television series produced by Zexcs. A sequel game, called Canvas 3: Hakugin no Portrait, would later be released by F&C.

== Gameplay ==
An example of gameplay in Canvas 2, showing the protagonist conversing with Elis

Canvas 2 is a romance visual novel in which the player assumes the role of the protagonist, Hiroki Kamikura. Much of the gameplay is spent reading the text that appears on the screen, representing dialogue between the characters and Hiroki's inner thoughts. The text is accompanied by character sprites over background art, allowing the player to identify which characters are talking. Every so often, the player will reach a "decision point" where they must choose from multiple options displayed on the screen; the choices that the player makes throughout the game will affect the plot's progression. The primary objective of the game is to earn the favor of one of the game's five main heroines, and to build a relationship with them. There are five main story routes and endings that the player can experience, one for each heroine. At certain points in the game, the player will encounter CG artwork taking the place of character sprites and background art; in adult-rated versions of the game, there is artwork depicting the heroines in sexual situations. In the PlayStation 2 version, adult content was removed and two additional story routes became playable. The game is fully voiced, with the exception of Hiroki and secondary characters.

== Plot ==
Canvas 2 takes place five years after the events of the first game. The story revolves around Hiroki Kamikura, a dispassionate art teacher who gave up on his dream of being a painter. After a friend plagiarized his work and stole his fame in art university, and a traumatizing incident that occurred at his high school reunion, he no longer derives any enjoyment from painting and even the act of picking up a paint brush pains him. He teaches students at Nadeshiko Academy (撫子学園, Nadeshiko Gakuen), a prestigious institution that places an emphasis on art and has produced many famous artists. At home, Hiroki takes care of his younger cousin Elis Hōsen, who moved in with him after passing the entrance exam for Nadeshiko Academy. During his time teaching at the academy, he builds relationships with various female students and teachers, and as he learns about their own struggles and passions, he gradually begins to rediscover himself and regain his love for painting.

== Characters ==
The protagonist of Canvas 2 is Hiroki Kamikura (上倉 浩樹, Kamikura Hiroki), a once-aspiring artist who now works as an art teacher at Nadeshiko Academy. Despite teaching art at a prestigious school, he has no passion for painting anymore due to his emotional past. He has adopted an apathetic attitude towards life and tends to go with the flow without trying too hard. Hiroki lives with his half-Japanese-half-French younger cousin Elis Hōsen (鳳仙 エリス, Hōsen Elis; voiced by Naho Nakaya), who is the main heroine of Canvas 2. Elis is an innocent and lively girl who has a brother complex towards Hiroki. She is very skilled at painting, but due to being traumatized by the accident that took her parents' lives, she has an extreme aversion to the color red. After passing the entrance exam, she enrolls in Nadeshiko Academy as a first-year student.

Hiroki ends up being reunited with his tomboyish childhood friend Kiri Kikyō (桔梗 霧, Kikyō Kiri; voiced by Yuri Sawa) after she starts working as a physical education teacher at Nadeshiko Academy. A friend of Hiroki's since kindergarten, she once confessed her love to him in high school, but was rejected by him, causing a strain in their relationship. Despite their complicated history, Kiri is a caring friend towards Hiroki and tries to keep their professional and personal lives separate, reflecting her responsible nature; however, she still has some feelings for Hiroki. Hiroki also befriends the mischievous and energetic second-year student Kana Hagino (萩野 可奈, Hagino Kana; voiced by Kanoko Hatamiya), who looks younger than she really is due to her short stature and childlike face. Kana is a talented best-selling romance novelist who takes inspiration from the other characters' relationships for her stories. She attends Hiroki's art classes and often shares her manuscript with Hiroki for him to critique.

Sumire Misaki (美咲 菫, Misaki Sumire; voiced by Misa Kimura), a third-year student at the academy, also attends Hiroki's art classes. She comes from a family of talented artists, but she has no interest in art and practices singing in the choir club. She is often referred to as the "Nadeshiko Diva" (撫子の歌姫, Nadeshiko no Utahime). Sumire is shy and reserved, and feels insecure about herself due to being compared to her older sister. Nadeshiko Academy is run by the acting chairwoman and world-famous cello player Saya Saginomiya (鷺ノ宮 紗綾, Saginomiya Saya; voiced by Himawari Natsuno). Saya has a gentle and ladylike disposition, and is well liked by the students of the academy. She holds her younger sister Ai in high regard and talks about her often. She is very well-versed when it comes to wielding the naginata and coaches the naginata club.

== Development and release ==
Canvas 2 is the sequel to F&C's prior visual novel, Canvas: Sepia-iro no Motif, and is the second installment in the Canvas series. An early concept for the game appeared in Naked Blue: Canvas Wallpaper Collection, a fan disc to Canvas: Sepia-iro no Motif, as a preview to a fictitious work called Canvas 2: 2nd Stage. Two members of staff who were involved with Canvas: Sepia-iro no Motif, Yū Miyamura and Sakana, returned to work on Canvas 2. Naru Nanao, who had previously worked on Circus' visual novel Da Capo, was in charge of designing the characters Elis and Kiri. Chikotam provided the character designs for Kana, Saya, and the side character Shie Sugihara, and Sakana provided the character design for Sumire. Miyamura, who served as the director of the project, was also in charge of scenario writing for Elis and Kiri. Shinjitsu Jōchi wrote the scenarios for Kana and Sumire, while Takuya Tanaka wrote the scenario for Saya. Lastly, the game's music was composed by Elements Garden.

Canvas 2 was released as an adult game for Windows as a CD-ROM on April 23, 2004. A limited edition of the game came bundled with a setting materials collection, and another limited edition was released which came with an F&C card. A PlayStation 2 port titled Canvas 2: Niji-iro no Sketch (Canvas2 〜虹色のスケッチ〜; Canvas 2 ~Rainbow-colored Sketch~) was released by Kadokawa Shoten on January 26, 2006. The PS2 port includes new voice acting, removes the adult content from the Windows version and adds two new heroines, Mami Takeuchi and Tomoko Fujinami, with their own playable story routes. The deluxe edition release came bundled with a magazine book, a drama CD, and a DVD containing movie sequences. A DVD-ROM version of the game, titled Canvas 2 DVD Edition, was released by F&C on October 6, 2006, as a limited edition, which comes bundled with cushion covers featuring illustrations of the heroines. The regular edition was released on January 26, 2007. A downloadable version of Canvas 2 DVD Edition would later become available on March 19, 2010. AiCherry released Canvas 2 DVD Edition as a DVD player game (DVDPG) on November 28, 2008, and later released a renewal package version on February 12, 2015. The game became playable on iOS devices on January 12, 2013.

=== Fan disc and Nadeshiko ===
Before the release of the main game, an adult fan disc titled Innocent Colors: Canvas 2 Fan Disc was sold in advance at Comiket 66 on January 13, 2004, as a CD-ROM. The general release version of the game was sold on September 24, 2004. Innocent Colors is set years before the events of Canvas 2, and focuses on exploring Hiroki and Kiri's relationship in high school. Kiri is the only heroine that can be romanced in the game, but the other heroines of Canvas 2 make appearances in the story. The fan disc includes a collection of wallpapers drawn by various artists, mini-games, and a mini-drama that continues the story of the Canvas 2: Prism-iro no Summer Festa drama CD. A downloadable version of the game was made available on December 31, 2010.

An adult spin-off game, titled Akai Canvas Series Nadeshiko: Aka-iro no Rasen (赤い Canvas シリーズ なでしこ ～朱色のらせん～; Red Canvas Series Nadeshiko: Red-colored Spiral), was released by F&C as a DVD-ROM on January 26, 2007; the game was released with a disc containing various bonus content, and the special limited edition release came with an F&C card and a 16-page setting materials collection. Nadeshiko was released as a DVD game by Dennō Club on October 25, 2007, and it was made available for download on March 6, 2009. The game takes place six months prior to the events of Canvas 2 and features four original heroines, each with her own story route. The protagonist is Sōji Aikawa, a minor character from Canvas 2 who works at Nadeshiko Academy as a P.E. teacher.

== Related media ==
=== Print ===
A manga adaptation, illustrated by Miki Kodama and titled Canvas 2: Extra Season (Canvas2 ～エクストラ・シーズン～, Canvas 2: Ekusutora Shīzun), was serialized in Ace Momogumi and Monthly Shōnen Ace between March and December 2004. The manga was compiled into a single bound volume and released by Kadokawa Shoten on April 9, 2005. A second manga illustrated by Kodama, titled Canvas 2: Niji-iro no Sketch, was serialized in Monthly Shōnen Ace between April 2005 and September 2006. The manga was also serialized in Comp Ace between March 26, 2005, and July 26, 2006. Kadokawa Shoten released four volumes of the manga under their Kadokawa Comics Ace imprint between September 20, 2005, and August 10, 2006. The fourth volume contains various side stories which were published in Comp Ace.

A 215-page light novel, based on Elis' scenario from the game, was published by Enterbrain under the Famitsu Bunko imprint and released on July 20, 2004. The light novel was written by Izumi Okazaki and illustrated by Fumio, who is known for his artwork in various visual novels. Two light novel volumes, which were written by Tohru Tamegai with illustrations by Naru Nanao and Miki Kodama, were published by Kadokawa Shoten. The first, titled Canvas 2: Niji-iro no Sketch Before Red, was released on December 22, 2005, while the second, titled Canvas 2: Niji-iro no Sketch Beyond Red, was released on March 24, 2006.

A 143-page visual fan book titled Canvas 2: Akane-iro no Palette Official Visual Guide (Canvas2 ～茜色のパレット～ 公式ビジュアルガイド) was published by Kadokawa Shoten on October 25, 2004. The book contained visual and strategy guides, staff interviews, and illustrations. On March 24, 2006, Kadokawa published a second visual fan book for the PlayStation 2 version of Canvas 2, titled Canvas 2: Niji-iro no Sketch Official Visual Fan Guide (Canvas2 ～虹色のスケッチ～ 公式ビジュアルファンガイド). The book was 96 pages long, and contained graphics, illustrations, concept art, information about the anime, original manga, and stories.

=== Anime ===
An anime adaptation tied closely to the PlayStation 2 version of the game titled Canvas 2: Niji-iro no Sketch was announced in April 2005. It was produced by Zexcs, directed by Itsuro Kawasaki, and written by Reiko Yoshida, while the character designs were provided by Yasunari Nitta. 24 episodes aired in Japan on Chiba TV, TV Saitama, TV Kanagawa, KBS Kyoto, Sun TV, and TV Aichi between October 2, 2005, and March 26, 2006. Each episode is named after a different shade of color.

Twelve separate DVD volumes, containing two episodes of the anime each, were released by Kadokawa Pictures between January 27 and December 22, 2006. The regular edition DVDs included a jacket cover featuring an original illustration by Naru Nanao, a booklet, and a bonus segment called Warning Comment Gekijō (ワーニング・コメント劇場, Warning Comment Theater). The limited edition DVDs, titled the Eien no Koigokoro (Eternal Rouge) (永遠の恋心(エターナル・ルージュ), Eternal Love (Eternal Rouge)) version, also came bundled with an illustrated card set, an original drama CD, and a card holder album. Two DVD box sets, containing twelve episodes each, were released by Kadokawa Entertainment on November 28 and December 26, 2008. Canvas 2: Niji-iro no Sketch was licensed in North America by Kadokawa Pictures USA, but the subsidiary shut down before the anime was released in English. However, the series would later become available for streaming on Crunchyroll with English subtitles.

=== Drama CDs ===
The first drama CD, titled Canvas 2: Indian Summer (Chīsana Usotsuki) (Canvas2 インディアン・サマー ～小さな嘘つき～, Canvas 2: Indian Samā (Chīsana Usotsuki); Canvas 2: Indian Summer (Little Liar)), was released on April 23, 2004, enclosed in volume 15 of SoftBank's Raspberry magazine. Marine Entertainment released a drama CD titled Canvas 2: Prism-iro no Summer Festa (Canvas2 〜プリズム色のサマーフェスタ〜, Canvas 2: Purizumu-iro Samā Fesuta; Canvas 2: Prism-colored Summer Festa) on October 29, 2004. A drama CD titled Canvas 2 Rhapsody de Noel was sold at Comiket 67 on February 20, 2005. Canvas 2: Extra Season Drama CD (Canvas2-エクストラ・シーズン-ドラマCD) came bundled with the deluxe edition of the PlayStation 2 release on January 26, 2006, based on the manga adaptation of the same name and featuring cover art by Miki Kodama, who illustrated the manga. A drama CD based on the PS2 version, titled Canvas 2: First Kiss wa, Nani Iro? (Canvas2 〜ファーストKISSは、なに色?〜, Canvas 2 ~What Color is a First Kiss?~), was sold by F&C in a spring mail order campaign on April 28, 2006. The final drama CD, titled Canvas 2 DVD Edition: Nana-iro no Party = Surprise! (Canvas2 DVD EDITION ～なな色のパーティ=サプライズ!～, Canvas 2 DVD Edition: Nana-iro no Pāti Sapuraizu!; Canvas 2 DVD Edition: Seven-colored Party = Surprise!), was released at Comiket 71 on December 29, 2006.

== Music ==
The opening theme for the Windows version of Canvas 2 is "Plastic Smile" (プラスチックスマイル, Purasutikku Sumairu) by A Bone with vocals by Yuria, while the ending theme is "Hibi" (日々; Days), which was sung by Rena. The PlayStation 2 version features two new songs: its opening theme is "Blue Sky" by Honey Bee, and its ending theme is "Primary Memory" (プライマリーメモリー, Puraimarī Memorī) by Sweets Tankentai. The vocals for both songs were performed by Yuria. A single called Canvas 2 Remix CD was released on April 23, 2004, as one of the CDs included in the game's original release; the single's two tracks contained the full versions of "Plastic Smile" and "Hibi". An original soundtrack for the game, titled Canvas 2 Original Sound Tracks, was released by Tyrell Lab on September 17, 2004, consisting of 21 tracks. The soundtrack was released in an early sale at Comiket 66. A remix album titled Plastic Smile+ (プラスチックスマイル+, Purasutikku Sumairu+) was released for the PS2 version on January 27, 2006, by Bandai Visual, containing six tracks.

The opening theme of the anime is "Plastic Smile (Niji-iro Guitar Version)" (プラスチックスマイル (虹色ギターversion), Plastic Smile (Rainbow-colored Guitar Version)) by Honey Bee, and the ending theme is "Na Na Iro" by Sweets Tankentai; both songs were again performed by Yuria. A maxi single containing the full versions of "Plastic Smile (Niji-iro Guitar Version)" and "Blue Sky", along with their karaoke versions, was released by Bandai on October 28, 2005. The full versions of "Na Na Iro" and "Primary Memory" were released on November 25, 2005, as another maxi single by Bandai, which also included the songs' karaoke versions. Bandai released two image song maxi singles based on the anime on December 23, 2005; the first single contained character songs for Elis which were sung by her anime voice actress, Kaori Nazuka, while the second contained character songs for Kiri which were sung by her anime voice actress, Hitomi Nabatame. The anime's original soundtrack, titled Canvas 2: Niji-iro no Sketch Original Soundtrack "Nana-iro no Portrait" (Canvas2～虹色のスケッチ～ オリジナルサウンドトラック 「なないろのポートレート」, Canvas2: Nijiiro no Suketchi Orijinaru Saundotorakku "Nanairo no Pōtorēto"; Canvas 2: Rainbow-colored Sketch Original Soundtrack "Rainbow-colored Portrait"), was released by Bandai on March 24, 2006, consisting of 37 tracks.

== Reception ==
In a national sales ranking of bishōjo games conducted by PC News, the original Windows version of Canvas 2 premiered as the second best-selling game at the time of its release. The game's ranking fell to 12 in the following two weeks. Canvas 2 was also ranked as the second best-selling game of April 2004 on Getchu.com, and ranked 21st in the 2004 annual sales ranking. Innocent Colors premiered as the seventh best-selling PC game that same year in September, while it ranked slightly higher on Getchu.com as fifth in sales for September 2004. Canvas 2 DVD Edition premiered as the best-selling game on the website in October 2006, and was ranked at 38 in 2006 overall. According to the Japanese video game magazine Famitsu, the PlayStation 2 version of the game sold 18,169 copies in 2007.

In the 2004 Moe Game Ranking hosted on Getchu.com, users cast votes for the most popular bishōjo games in the following categories: overall, scenario, music, graphics, system, and heroines. Canvas 2 was ranked eleventh place in the overall category, 9th in scenario, 8th in graphics, and Elis was voted as the 8th most popular heroine. The PS2 version was reviewed by Famitsu, which gave it an overall score of 24/40. In the October 2007 issue of Dengeki G's Magazine, a poll revealing the readers' picks for the top 50 bishōjo games was published. Out of 249 titles, Canvas 2 ranked 37th with six votes.
