= Drover (company) =

British company providing vehicle subscriptions

- Type: Privately held company
- Industry: Automotive Industry
- Founded: 2015
- Founder: Felix Leuschner; Matt Varughese
- Defunct: June 22, 2022; 4 years ago
- Headquarters: London, UK
- Services: Car Subscriptions
- Number of employees: 120
- Website: www.joindrover.com

Drover was a British company providing vehicle subscriptions.

Users paid a recurring fee for the right to use a car with insurance, maintenance, tax, MOT and breakdown coverage, and could swap vehicles during the subscription or to cancel their subscriptions outright.

== History ==
Drover was founded in late 2015 by Felix Leuschner, previously CEO of a fashion platform Sylistpick and virtual goods market Gamegoods, and Matt Varughese. They had observed that most of the innovation in the mobility space had been focused on how to get from A to B but that very little had been done around car ownership itself.

In March 2018, Drover received funding of £5.5m from investors including BP Ventures, Partech Ventures and Cherry Ventures. This was on top of a £2m pre-seed investment.

In April 2018, Drover partnered with BMW Group to provide BMW and Mini vehicles on the platform.

In December 2020, Drover announced that they were being acquired by Cazoo.

In June 2022, Cazoo announced the closure of their 'cash intensive' car subscription services as part of a cost cutting plan.

== Service ==
Drover did not own any cars, but provided a marketplace for vehicle subscriptions. Users pay a monthly fee for a car, including insurance, breakdown cover, maintenance tax and MOT. There are no long term commitments so users can swap, upgrade, downgrade or cancel their subscriptions. Felix Leuschner, CEO, claims that by providing a more seamless, online and all-inclusive experience, Drover will be able to improve the typical car purchasing experience.

In 2018, some industry experts had predicted that the rise of autonomous vehicles will see traditional finance methods superseded by subscription services.
