= Canvas: Sepia-iro no Motif =

2000 video game

- Cover art for Canvas DVD

Canvas ～セピア色のモチーフ～ (Canvas ~Sepia-iro no Mochīfu~)
- Genre: Romance
- Video game
- Developer: Cocktail Soft/F&C FC01
- Publisher: F&C (Windows); NEC Interchannel (DC, PS2); AiCherry (DVDPG)
- Genre: Eroge, visual novel
- Platform: Windows, Dreamcast, PlayStation 2, DVD game, iOS
- Released: JP: November 24, 2000 (Windows)
- Light novel
- Written by: Izumi Okazaki
- Illustrated by: Satoshi Kiba
- Published by: Enterbrain
- Published: July 19, 2001
- Original video animation
- Directed by: Hisashi Tomii
- Produced by: Lemon Heart
- Written by: Yoshio Takaoka
- Studio: Triple X
- Released: December 25, 2001 – March 25, 2002
- Runtime: 30 minutes each
- Episodes: 2

Canvas: Sepia-iro no Motif (Canvas ～セピア色のモチーフ～, Canvas ~Sepia-iro no Mochīfu~; lit. Canvas ~Sepia-colored Motif~) is a Japanese adult visual novel developed by Cocktail Soft, a brand of F&C. It was released for Windows on November 24, 2000. The game was later ported to the Dreamcast and PlayStation 2 systems, with the latter removing all adult content. The story follows Daisuke Asō, a student at Nadeshiko Academy who lost his passion for watercolor painting, but he is warned that he must perform well at a competition in order to keep his scholarship. The main focus of the story are Daisuke's relationships with the five main heroines.

Much of Canvas's gameplay is spent reading the dialogue and narrative, and the player's choices affect how the plot progresses. There are five main story routes, one for each heroine, that can be played through. The game was ranked as the best-selling bishōjo game twice consecutively at the time of its release. The game has been adapted into other forms of media, such as a light novel, a manga anthology, an adult original video animation (OVA), and drama CDs. A sequel game called Canvas 2: Akane-iro no Palette was later released.

== Gameplay ==
An example of gameplay in Canvas, showing the protagonist conversing with Amane

Canvas is a romance visual novel in which the player assumes the role of the protagonist, Daisuke Asō. The game is largely spent reading the dialogue and narrative which appears as text on the screen. The text is accompanied by character sprites over background art, signalling who the player is talking to. Every so often, the player will come to a "decision point" where they will be presented with multiple options that appear on screen; the player's choice at these points will affect the plot progression and the ending they receive. There are five main heroines, each with her own story route and ending, that Daisuke can enter a romantic relationship with. In the Dreamcast version, an additional story route was added for Aya Misaki. The focus of the game largely revolves around earning the heroines' affection through the player's interactions and choices. There are instances throughout the game where the player will encounter CG artwork taking the place of character sprites and background art; in adult-rated versions of the game, erotic art depicting the heroines can be viewed.

== Plot ==
=== Story ===
The story revolves around Daisuke Asō, a scholarship student enrolled at the prestigious art school, Nadeshiko Academy (撫子学園, Nadeshiko Gakuen). Daisuke is a gifted artist who has won many competitions for his skills in watercolor painting, but as he started suspecting that the school was using him for fame, he grew tired of painting. His situation becomes more complicated when he is warned by the school principal that his scholarship status will be revoked if he doesn't perform well in the next competition. However, through his interactions with the girls he meets and gets to know during his time at Nadeshiko Academy, he gradually starts to regain his passion for painting.

=== Main characters ===
The protagonist of Canvas is Daisuke Asō (麻生 大輔, Asō Daisuke), a second-year student at Nadeshiko Academy who is also a member of the art club. He has a talent for watercolor painting, but he no longer derives enjoyment from it and rarely participates in art club activities. While he can come across as blunt, he is a kind person deep down. He is seen as attractive which causes him to be popular with female students at the school. Amane Tachibana (橘 天音, Tachibana Amane; voiced by Miwa Kōzuki), Daisuke's childhood friend since elementary school, is the main heroine of Canvas. Despite having a clumsy and absentminded demeanor, she is smart and achieves excellent grades. Her dream is to become a veterinarian due to her love for animals. Amane has an affinity for sweet foods, especially anpan.

Ren Sakurazuka (桜塚 恋, Sakurazuka Ren; voiced by Akane Tomonaga), a first-year student at Nadeshiko Academy, becomes Daisuke's stepsister after their parents start dating and planning to marry. She is considered to be one of the most beautiful girls at school and constantly receives love confessions, causing her to distrust others due to thinking they only care about her appearance. She has a tsundere personality and works part-time at an ice cream shop. Daisuke's classmate from elementary school, Yuzu Nanashiro (七城 柚子, Nanashiro Yuzu; voiced by Tomomi Motoyama), attends Nadeshiko Academy as a second-year student, although he does not remember her. Yuzu is a high jumper in the track and field club, despite her small stature and frail disposition. She falls behind her peers when it comes to athletic ability, but she is a hard worker with an energetic personality. She has a feminine side as she enjoys cooking and knitting.

Yurina Kimikage (君影 百合奈, Kimikage Yurina; voiced by Kaori Fujisaki), Daisuke's senior, is a quiet and mysterious girl who has a fascination for flower language. She suffers from a chronic heart condition and believes her misfortune to be the result of a curse. Yurina rarely interacts with others, but she becomes familiar with the protagonist after he draws a portrait of her. Yū Shinomiya (篠宮 悠, Shinomiya Yū; voiced by Kihiro Haranishi) is an intern teacher working at Nadeshiko Academy who has a cheerful personality. She used to live next door to Daisuke and would often look after him when he was little, but she moved away. She teaches Japanese history at the school and she is well-liked by students. Daisuke used to have a crush on her.

== Development and release ==
Canvas: Sepia-iro no Motif is the first installment in F&C's Canvas series. Gayarō was in charge of character designs for Amane, Ren, and the side character Ai Saginomiya; Sakana drew the character designs for Yurina, Yū, and the side character Ruriko Misono; finally, Tatsuya Kurusu, credited under the pseudonym Ponz, was responsible for the character design of Yuzu. Hiroaki Amashiro was in charge of scenario writing for Amane and Yū's routes; Yū Miyamura wrote the scenarios for Ren and Ai's routes; lastly, Yuzu and Yurina's scenarios were written by Daisuke Tonoike. The game's music was composed by Doors Music Entertainment.

Canvas was first released as an adult game for Windows on November 24, 2000, as a limited edition CD-ROM, with another limited edition release including an F&C card. The regular edition was released on December 10, 2000. A Dreamcast port was released by NEC Interchannel on April 5, 2001, and an additional story route was added for the new heroine Aya Misaki, who was included in all future releases. Adult scenes from the original game were optically censored in the Dreamcast version. A DVD-ROM version, titled Canvas DVD: Sepia-iro no Motif, was released on November 22, 2001, including improved audio quality and a piano mode. NEC Interchannel released a PlayStation 2 port for all ages with adult content removed, titled Canvas: Sepia-iro no Motif New Best Collection (Canvas ～セピア色のモチーフ～ ニューベストコレクション), on April 10, 2003. The PS2 version was later re-released with a lower price under the title Canvas: Sepia-iro no Motif Best Edition (Canvas ～セピア色のモチーフ～ ベスト版) on March 3, 2005.

Canvas DVD was made available for download on May 25, 2007, and AiCherry released Canvas DVD as a DVD player game (DVDPG) on July 25, 2008. Canvas was made playable on iOS devices on August 27, 2012. For the 20th anniversary of Canvas DVD, F&C re-released the DVD version with a new packaging design on March 26, 2021. The release came bundled with an illustrated postcard. A fully-animated remake of the game with 3D graphics, titled 3D Canvas: 3D&VR Edition, was released as a downloadable game by F&C on October 15, 2021. The remake implements a virtual reality (VR) system, which is compatible with the Oculus Rift S, Oculus Quest, and Quest 2. 3D Canvas includes Ai's scenario from the fan disc Naked Blue: Canvas Wallpaper Collection.

=== Fan disc ===
On August 10, 2001, an adult fan disc for the game titled Naked Blue: Canvas Wallpaper Collection was released as a limited edition CD-ROM at Comiket 60. The general sales edition was released on September 21, 2001. The game contains playable story routes for Ren and Ai, a wallpaper collection, a sound library, a typing minigame called Anpan Fight (あんぱんファイト), and a preview to a fictitious work called Canvas 2: 2nd Stage, which served as an early concept for Canvas 2: Akane-iro no Palette.

== Related media ==
=== Print ===
A 222-page light novel, which was adapted from the Dreamcast version of Canvas, was published by Enterbrain under their Famitsu Bunko imprint and released on July 19, 2001. It was written by Izumi Okazaki and illustrated by Satoshi Kiba. Enterbrain also published a manga anthology titled Canvas: Sepia-iro no Motif Visual Comic Anthology (Canvas ～セピア色のモチーフ～ ビジュアル・コミック・アンソロジー), which was released under their Magical Cute imprint on October 1, 2001.

A 143-page visual fan book called Canvas: Sepia-iro no Motif Official Guide (Canvas ～セピア色のモチーフ～ 公式ガイド) was published by SoftBank Publishing under their Dorimaga Books imprint and released on May 1, 2001. The book was released for the Dreamcast version of Canvas, containing strategy guides, CGs from the game, and information about the new heroine, Aya Misaki. Another fan book, titled Canvas: Sepia-iro no Motif Visual Fan Book (Canvas ～セピア色のモチーフ～ ビジュアルファンブック), was published by Enterbrain under their Magical Cute imprint and released on September 14, 2001, consisting of 86 pages. The book contains walkthroughs, interviews with staff and voice actors, and production materials.

=== Anime ===
Canvas was adapted into a two-episode adult original video animation (OVA) series, which was produced by Lemon Heart, animated by Triple X, and directed by Hisashi Tomii, while the screenplay was written by Yoshio Takaoka. Both episodes were released on VHS and DVD and distributed by Groove Corporation. The first episode was released on December 25, 2001, and the second episode was released on March 25, 2002; a poster and three trading cards came bundled with both as an initial release bonus. The limited edition releases came with an illustrated telephone card.

=== Music and audio CDs ===
The opening theme for Canvas is "Autumn Destiny", while the ending theme is "Omoide" (おもいで, Memories); both songs were performed by Miyuki Kunitake. "Autumn Destiny" and "Omoide" were included in the game's original soundtrack, which was released as a CD by Love Love Records on December 28, 2000, containing 13 tracks in total. Love Love Records would also go on to release a piano arrangement album called Canvas Piano Collection Nao Plays Piano, which was released on September 1, 2001, containing 14 tracks. Two drama CDs based on the game were released by Movic; the first, titled Drama CD "Canvas: Sepia-iro Motif" Featuring Amane Tachibana, was released on January 26, 2002, containing 10 tracks and focusing on Amane. A second drama CD focusing on Ren was released on March 9, 2002, titled Drama CD "Canvas: Sepia-iro Motif" Featuring Ren Sakurazuka and containing 10 tracks.

== Reception ==
According to a national sales ranking of bishōjo games conducted by PC News, Canvas premiered at number one twice at the time of its release. The game's ranking fell to 28 in the following two weeks, but sales increased at the beginning of January, with the game achieving a higher ranking at 14. In the latter half of January, Canvas was ranked at number 34, and then the game made its last appearance in the sales ranking at 32 in February. The general sales edition of Naked Blue: Canvas Wallpaper Collection premiered as the seventh best-selling bishōjo game at the time of its release. Naked Blue's placement fell to 48 in the next ranking. In BugBug magazine's 2001 Readers' Choice Bishōjo Game Annual Ranking, Canvas DVD was ranked 18th out of 20 with 137 votes in the graphics category.

The OVA version received a mostly negative review from Carlos Ross of T.H.E.M. Anime Reviews, who compared the experience of watching Canvas to "tuning into Marmalade Boy, only to find out it's been rewritten for the Spice Channel." He described the romance aspects of the OVA as "pretty thin, largely due to Daisuke being a grade-A jerk until the last ten minutes of this show, where he has a change of heart." He also criticized the animation as "Z-grade" and the dialogue as "nothing more than recycled high school garbage". However, he gave small praise to the character designs, calling them "sorta kinda cute".
