= Canvassing (disambiguation) =

Canvassing is the systematic initiation of direct contact with individuals, commonly used during political campaigns.

Canvassing or Canvass may also refer to:

- "Canvassing" (Parks and Recreation), an episode of the TV series
- Peddling, or canvassing, by a traveling vendor of goods
- Vote counting and validation of the outcome, in the United States
- Canvass White (1790–1834), an American engineer and inventor

== See also ==
- Canvas, an extremely durable plain-woven fabric
- Canvas fingerprinting, a browser fingerprinting technique
