= Blank Canvas =

Blank Canvas may refer to:

- Blank Canvas, a documentary film
- Blank Canvas: My So-Called Artist's Journey, an autobiographical comic by Akiko Higashimura
- Live at the Blank Canvas, a live DVD album by The Music
- Black Hole/Blank Canvas, an album by Motorpsycho
