= Canvas Networks =

2010–2014 American imageboard website

Canvas Networks, Inc.

- Website type: Imageboard
- Available in: English
- Owner: Christopher "moot" Poole
- Website: canv.as
- Commercial: Yes
- Launched: May 11, 2010
- Current status: Defunct as of January 21, 2014; 12 years ago

Canvas Networks was a website centered on sharing and remixing media, particularly images. The website was established by the founder of 4chan, Christopher Poole. It closed in 2014.

== Company and funding ==
Reports indicate that Canvas Networks received at least US$3.63 million in seed funding. The site had seven employees and was based in New York City.

== History ==
On January 31, 2011, Canvas officially opened, sending out invitations to users who had previously signed up to receive updates. In March 2011, Canvas made its discussion threads viewable by users who were not registered, while remaining in closed beta status. In early 2011, Poole began to virally market Canvas on sites such as Reddit. Canvas moved from private beta to open beta on September 6, 2011, at which point Poole reported that over fifty thousand users had registered during the private beta period. On January 21, 2014, the Canvas blog announced that the site was shutting down. The Canvas team promised that users would be able to download their contributions to the site in the near future, and proposed the possibility of an archive of the site's old threads.

Poole called his newer project, DrawQuest, "by all accounts a success", but noted that it had been created (in early 2013) "after the failure of our first product, Canvas". He hoped to keep DrawQuest running for "a few more months". Poole told TechCrunch that his team was "never able to crack the business side of things in time", that the value of their user community was not apparent to investors, and that they could not sufficiently monetize in-game purchases.

== Site features and purpose ==
Canvas was an imageboard that allowed for anonymous and non-anonymous sharing and commenting on media, as well as the "remixing" of posted images, and the adding of music to animated GIFs. Unlike 4chan or other sites such as Reddit, Canvas had image editing tools built into it, negating the need for desktop editing programs like Adobe Photoshop in order to share with the site's community. Poole's goal with the website was to "reimagine forums in a world where everyone has a fast, modern browser". He asserts that the central idea of Canvas is "play", where "photo, video, and audio is all interactive, malleable, and participatory".

Though the site was intentionally separate from 4chan, it also emphasized anonymity, and allowed people to post anonymously or using pseudonyms. Despite the ability to act anonymously, the site received some criticism, especially from users of 4chan, for at first offering Facebook Connect as the only signup mechanism. It subsequently moved away from that policy.

== Closure ==
On January 14, 2015, founder Christopher Poole announced that the company had been dissolved in December 2014 with the remaining funds being donated to charity. This was, in part, due to a series of security breaches that had occurred on the website.
