= Scattered Lapsus$ Hunters =

Cybercrime group

Scattered LAPSUS$ Hunters
- Named after: Collation of ShinyHunters, Scattered Spider, and Lapsus$
- Formation: 2025
- Founder: ShinyHunters
- Type: Cybercrime gang
- Methods: Spearphishing, SIM swapping, recruitment of accomplices via social media, extortion, hacking, Social engineering (security), Ransomware
- Members: Over 10 (suspected to be more)
- Official language: English, French
- ShinyHunters: ShinyCorp
- Parent organization: ShinyHunters
- Affiliations: ShinyHunters, Scattered Spider, and Lapsus$

Scattered Lapsus$ Hunters, sometimes referred to as UNC6040 and UNC6395, is a cybercrime supergroup also known and referred to as "Trinity of Chaos". The supergroup is an international extortion-focused collective or alliance. They first appeared in or around August 2025, and have claimed responsibility for several notable data breaches, including but not limited to; stealing over 1 billion customer records from Salesforce from both their UNC6040 and UNC6395 campaigns, RedHat and doxxing ICE officials. Their website BreachForums was seized by the US and French police forces in October 2025 following the public extortions against Salesforce. The supergroup claimed on their Telegram channel to be formed from members of other groups like Scattered Spider, Lapsus$ and ShinyHunters.

In October 2026, Reuters reported that a Jordanian teenager known online as "Rey", whom KrebsOnSecurity had described in 2025 as one of the administrators of the group's Telegram channel, had been detained in Jordan and was cooperating with the FBI's investigation of ShinyHunters following the 2026 FBI data breach.
