= FBI Cyber Division =

US Federal Bureau of Investigation division

Cyber Division
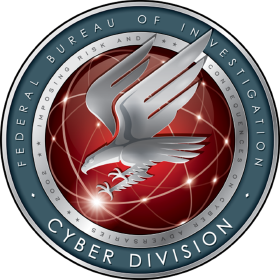
- Emblem of the Cyber Division
- Active: 2002–present (23–24 years)
- Country: United States
- Agency: Federal Bureau of Investigation
- Part of: Criminal, Cyber, Response, and Services Branch
- Headquarters: J. Edgar Hoover Building; Washington, D.C.
- Abbreviation: CyD

Commanders
- Current commander: Assistant Director Brett E. Leatherman

The Cyber Division (CyD) is a Federal Bureau of Investigation division which heads the national effort to investigate and prosecute internet crimes, including "cyber based terrorism, espionage, computer intrusions, and major cyber fraud." This division of the FBI uses the information it gathers during investigation to inform the public of current trends in cyber crime. It focuses around three main priorities: computer intrusion, identity theft, and cyber fraud. It was created in 2002.

In response to billions of dollars lost in cyber-crimes, that have had devastating impact on the United States' economic and national security, the FBI created a main "Cyber Division at FBI Headquarters to "address cyber crime in a coordinated and cohesive manner." Branching out from there, specially trained cyber squads have been placed in 56 field offices across the United States, staffed with "agents and analysts who protect against computer intrusions, theft of intellectual property and personal information, child pornography and exploitation, and online fraud." Due to internet threats around the world, the FBI has developed "cyber action teams" that travel globally to help in "computer intrusion cases" and gather information that helps to identify cyber crimes that are most dangerous to our national security.

Keeping the focus not only on national security but also on threats to citizens of the United States, the FBI has long been focused on identity theft, which is a growing concern for American citizens. Since fiscal year 2008 through the middle of fiscal year 2013, the number of identity theft related crimes investigated by the Bureau across all programs have resulted in more than 1,600 convictions, $78.6 million in restitutions, $4.6 billion in recoveries, and $6.8 billion in fines.

High priority is given to investigations that involve terrorist organizations or intelligence operations sponsored by foreign governments, which FBI calls "national security cyber intrusions". The Cyber Division has primary responsibility for the FBI's efforts to counter national security–related cyber intrusions. The Cyber Division priorities in rank order are:

(a) cyber intrusions;
(b) child sexual exploitation;
(c) intellectual property rights; and
(d) internet fraud.

FBI Cyber Division works through the National Cyber Investigative Joint Task Force (NCIJTF) and cyber investigative squads located in each FBI field office. Since 2008, NCIJTF is the primary American agency responsible for coordinating cyber threats investigations, and liaisons with Central Intelligence Agency (CIA), Department of Defense (DOD), Department of Homeland Security (DHS), and National Security Agency (NSA).

A large number of cases investigated by the Cyber Division come from the Internet Fraud Complaint Center (IFCC), which in 2002 received about 75,000 complaints.

Some cases that the Cyber Division has investigated included: dismantling a ring of criminals using malware to redirect users to rogue DNS servers (Operation Ghost Click); taking down a botnet based on Coreflood trojan used for fraud; taking down a group responsible for robbing over 2,000 ATMs at once; taking down a group of about 100 involved in phishing (Operation Phish Phry); and taking down of the DarkMarket cyber crime forum used by criminals.

== Organization ==
- Cyber Operations Branch
- Cyber Policy, Intelligence, and Engagement Branch
- Cyber Capabilities Branch

== See also ==
- Cyberterrorism
