= ShinyHunters =

Black-hat criminal hacker group

- Official Onion website as of May 2026
- Formation: 2019
- Type: Cybercrime hacker group
- Methods: Zero-day vulnerability, Voice phishing, data exfiltration, extortion
- Official language: English
- Leader: shinycorp
- Affiliations: The Com; Scattered Lapsus$ Hunters (claimed)

ShinyHunters is a criminal hacker group that has been active since 2019 and is involved in a significant number of data breaches.

ShinyHunters has utilized cloud misconfigurations, OAuth token theft via integration companies, supply chain attacks, zero-day exploits, voice phishing and other forms of advanced social engineering to gain access to the systems of its targets. After gaining access to a target, the group has been known to exfiltrate data and demand ransom payments. If targets do not pay the ransom, the stolen information is often leaked or sold on the dark web. ShinyHunters is believed to be affiliated with The Com, a large international network of cybercriminals. Their name is believed to be derived from Shiny Pokémon.

== Identity and membership ==
The name of the group is believed to be derived from Shiny Pokémon, an aspect of the Pokémon video game franchise whereby Pokémon have a rare chance of being encountered in an alternate, "shiny" color scheme; actively trying to collect such Pokémon through in-game strategies are often referred to as "shiny hunting".

There has been at least one instance of conflict over the legitimacy of the ShinyHunters name. The April 2026 breach of Vercel was carried out by an entity that claimed to be ShinyHunters, but the leadership associated with the real ShinyHunters denied that ShinyHunters was involved.

ShinyHunters' membership is believed to partially overlap with other groups linked to international cybercrime network The Com, including Scattered Spider and Lapsus$. Cybercrime group Scattered Lapsus$ Hunters claims to include members of all three groups. One of three administrators of the SLSH Telegram channel, operating under the alias "Rey," was publicly identified in November 2025 as a 15-year-old from Jordan. Google-owned cybersecurity firm Mandiant described ShinyHunters as "multiple threat clusters" operating under a single brand in January 2026, and a February 2026 analysis by Kim Zetter describes ShinyHunters and its peer groups as "[l]oose-knit cells" of The Com.

== Legal actions ==
In May 2022, Sébastien Raoult, a French programmer suspected of belonging to the group, was arrested in Morocco and extradited to the United States. He faced 20 to 116 years in prison. In January 2024, Raoult was sentenced to three years in prison and ordered to return $5 million. Twelve months of the sentence are for conspiracy to commit wire fraud and the remainder for aggravated identity theft. He will face 36 months of supervised release afterwards. Raoult had worked for the group for more than two years according to the United States Attorney for the Western District of Washington, but was not a major player within the group.

In May-June 2025, U.S. prosecutors in the District of Massachusetts charged Matthew D. Lane, a 19-year-old Massachusetts student, with hacking and extorting an education-technology provider widely reported to be PowerSchool. Prosecutors said that Lane used stolen contractor credentials to access the company's network in 2024, exfiltrate data on tens of millions of students and teachers, and demand a $2.85 million bitcoin ransom. Lane agreed to plead guilty on May 20, 2025, and entered a guilty plea on June 6, 2025. In November 13, 2025, he was sentenced to four years in prison, three years of supervised release, a fine of $25,000, restitution of $14,075,540.58 and forfeiture.

On June 25, 2025, French authorities announced that four members of the ShinyHunters cybercriminal group were arrested in multiple French regions for cybercrime activities. The coordinated global law enforcement effort targeted the "ShinyHunters", "Hollow", "Noct", and "Depressed" aliases. Attacks using the ShinyHunters name continued after the arrests, with targeted companies receiving extortion emails in which the senders identified themselves as ShinyHunters.

== Notable data breaches ==
=== 2020 ===
- Mathway: In January 2020, ShinyHunters breached Mathway, stealing roughly 25 million users' data. Mathway is an app for students that helps solve algebraic equations.
- Tokopedia: On May 2, 2020, Tokopedia was breached by ShinyHunters, which claimed to have data for 91 million user accounts, revealing users' gender, location, username, full name, email address, phone number, and hashed passwords.
- Wishbone: Also in May 2020, ShinyHunters leaked the full user database of the social media app Wishbone, which is said to contain personal information such as usernames, emails, phone numbers, city/state/country of residence, and hashed passwords.
- Microsoft: In May 2020, ShinyHunters also claimed to have stolen over 500 GB of Microsoft source code from the company's private GitHub account. The group published around 1GB of data from the hacked GitHub account on a hacking forum. Some cybersecurity experts doubted the claims until analyzing the code; upon analysis, ShinyHunters' claims were no longer in question. Microsoft told Wired in a statement that they are aware of the breach. Microsoft later secured its GitHub account, which was confirmed by ShinyHunters as they reported being unable to access any repositories.
- Wattpad: In July 2020, ShinyHunters gained access to a Wattpad database containing 270 million user records. Information leaked included usernames, real names, hashed passwords, email addresses, geographic location, gender, and date of birth.
- Pluto TV: In November 2020, it was reported that ShinyHunters gained access to the personal data of 3.2 million Pluto TV users. The hacked data included users' display names, email addresses, IP addresses, hashed passwords and dates of birth.
- Animal Jam: It was also reported in November 2020 that ShinyHunters was behind the hack of Animal Jam, leading to the exposure of 46 million accounts.
- Mashable: In November 2020, ShinyHunters leaked 5.22 GB worth of the Mashable database on a prominent hacker forum.

=== 2021 ===
- Pixlr: In January 2021, ShinyHunters leaked 1.9 million user records from Pixlr.
- Nitro PDF: In January 2021, a hacker claiming to be a part of ShinyHunters leaked the full database of Nitro PDF – which contains 77 million user records – on a hacker forum for free.
- Bonobos: In January 2021, it was reported that ShinyHunters leaked the full backup cloud database of Bonobos, a clothing company, to a hacker forum. The database is said to contain the address, phone numbers, and order details for 7 million customers; general account information for another 1.8 million registered customers; and 3.5 million partial credit card records and hashed passwords.
- AT&T Wireless: In 2021, ShinyHunters began selling information on 70 million AT&T wireless subscribers, which contained users' phone numbers, personal information and social security numbers. AT&T acknowledged the data breach in 2024.
- Aditya Birla Fashion and Retail: In December 2021, Indian retailer Aditya Birla Fashion and Retail was breached and ransomed. The ransom demand was allegedly rejected and data containing 5.4 million unique email addresses were subsequently dumped publicly on a popular hacking forum the next month. The data contained extensive personal customer information including names, phone numbers, physical addresses, birth dates, order histories and passwords stored as MD5 hashes.

=== 2023 ===
- Pizza Hut Australia: In September 2023, ShinyHunters claimed to have compromised more than 1 million customers' data and 30 million order records of Pizza Hut Australia. Pizza Hut Australia later acknowledged and confirmed the data breach.

=== 2024 ===
- AT&T Wireless: In April 2024, ShinyHunters again hacked AT&T Wireless and stole data on over 110 million customers. In May, AT&T paid a $370,000 ransom to one of the group's members to delete the data.
- Banco Santander: On May 30, 2024, the Spanish multinational bank Santander was breached by ShinyHunters, resulting in all Santander staff and 30 million customers in Spain, Chile and Uruguay compromised.
- Ticketmaster: ShinyHunters claimed responsibility for breaching Ticketmaster via their campaign targeting customers of the cloud storage firm Snowflake.
- PowerSchool: In December 2024, education-software vendor PowerSchool was breached; the attacker demanded $2.85 million and the company paid a ransom to prevent release of stolen student/teacher data. In early May 2025, new extortion emails began hitting individual school districts that were customers of PowerSchool, with outlets reporting attempts to leverage the stolen data from an earlier, unrelated PowerSchool breach identified by CrowdStrike. One message shared with DataBreaches.net demanded payment from North Carolina authorities, though the publication cautioned it could not authenticate the sender's identity. Bleeping Computer likewise reported that someone claiming to be ShinyHunters was extorting districts/customers of PowerSchool, while a person identifying as the group's leader told the outlet the culprit was an affiliate impersonating them.

=== 2025 ===
- Legal Aid Agency (U.K. Ministry of Justice): The Ministry of Justice disclosed on May 22, 2025 (updated September 4, 2025), that the Legal Aid Agency (LAA) suffered a cyber incident affecting applicants who used its digital service from 2007 until systems were taken offline on May 16, 2025; the MoJ has not named a culprit and says investigations are ongoing. In August 2025, multiple outlets reported that a group using the ShinyHunters name posted on Telegram (Scattered Lapsus$ Hunters) claiming responsibility and threatening to leak LAA data unless a member was freed; The Times and The Law Society Gazette covered the claim while noting authorities had not verified the posts and that the deadline passed without a leak.
- LVMH: In mid-2025, luxury conglomerate LVMH confirmed that several of its brands – including Louis Vuitton, Dior, and Tiffany & Co. – experienced unauthorized access to a customer information database managed by a third-party platform. While each subsidiary disclosed limited details (Tiffany & Co.'s Korean unit noted a "vendor platform" was breached), investigators later tied these incidents to the ShinyHunters Salesforce data-theft campaign. The threat actors privately extorted the firms via email (using the ShinyHunters name) and were ultimately identified as part of the UNC6040/UNC6240 clusters described by Google.
- Google: On June 4, 2025, Google Threat Intelligence Group (GTIG) reported on UNC6040, a cluster of voice phishing campaigns targeting organizations' Salesforce instances. The attackers used modified versions of Data Loader to export Salesforce data and subsequently extort the victims. GTIG attributed the activity to ShinyHunters. On August 5, 2025, Google confirmed that a corporate Salesforce instance of Google's containing contact information and notes for small and medium-sized businesses had been compromised by UNC6040/ShinyHunters activity.
- Qantas: In July 2025, Australian airline Qantas suffered a cyberattack that exposed data of approximately 5.7 million customers. Initially attributed to Scattered Spider by multiple professional security researchers and journalists, it was later confirmed to be the work of ShinyHunters.
- Jaguar Land Rover: On September 2, 2025, Jaguar Land Rover (JLR) disclosed a cyber incident and proactively shut down systems, causing severe disruption to production and retail operations. In the days that followed, outlets reported that a ShinyHunters/Scattered Spider–aligned collective claimed responsibility; JLR said there was no evidence of customer data theft at that time and notified the UK ICO.
- Kering: In September 2025, ShinyHunters was linked to a major data breach affected Kering, the French luxury goods group that owns brands such as Gucci, Balenciaga, and Alexander McQueen. ShinyHunters claimed to have stolen personal data from Balenciaga, Gucci, Brioni, and Alexander McQueen. The group claimed they compromised 43,483,137 million records exclusively from Gucci and approximately 7.4 million unique customer records across Balenciaga, Brioni, and Alexander McQueen. The data included not limited to, names, email addresses, phone numbers, physical addresses, and total spend amounts from luxury store purchases. Kering confirmed the incident, stating that an unauthorized third party accessed limited customer information and that no financial data (such as credit card or bank info) was compromised. ShinyHunters reportedly attempted to extort the company following the breach, which was identified in June 2025 and publicly disclosed months later.
- University of Pennsylvania: In November 2025, hackers associated with ShinyHunters targeted the University of Pennsylvania. The data breach likely affected over 1 million individuals, including students, alumni, and donors.
- Princeton University: In November 2025, hackers associated with ShinyHunters targeted Princeton University.
- Harvard University: In late November 2025, hackers associated with ShinyHunters targeted Harvard University.
- Pornhub: In December 2025, ShinyHunters claimed responsibility for the Pornhub breach affected by the Mixpanel campaign. ShinyHunters claimed 94 GB of historical analytics data containing over 200 million records of Pornhub users email addresses, search history, watch/download activity, location data, and video metadata. ShinyHunters attempted to extort the company with threats of public release. Pornhub stated the incident stemmed from a third-party analytics service Mixpanel and that no passwords or financial information were compromised.
- SoundCloud: In December 2025, ShinyHunters was linked to a SoundCloud breach that exposed personal information tied to roughly 29.8 million user accounts (about 20% of platforms user base), including email addresses, usernames, avatars, follower count and locations. ShinyHunters allegedly accessed data via an ancillary service dashboard, and following attempted extortion the compromised records were reportedly published, underscoring the group's continued focus on large-scale data theft and ransom-or-release tactics.

=== 2026 ===
- Grubhub: In January 2026, several older and newer Grubhub data breach incidents were linked to ShinyHunters in a targeted combined extortion against Grubhub.
- Panera Bread: In January 2026, a data breach affected around 5 million people (14 million records) with leakage to the dark web; the group exploited a Microsoft Entra SSO installation.
- Figure Technology Solutions: In February 2026, Figure suffered a data breach that involved around 1 million people records being stolen and affected with leakage to the dark web; yet another breach in the ShinyHunters Okta SSO campaign.
- Wynn Resorts: In February 2026, Wynn Resorts was targeted by the cyber-extortion group ShinyHunters, who claimed to have stolen over 800,000 customer records and employee data from the company's systems.
- Odido: In February 2026, Odido suffered a data breach affecting around 6 million people (21 million records) with leakage to the dark web.
- Aura: In March 2026, ShinyHunters unlawfully accessed over 900,000 records including names, home addresses, telephone numbers, email addresses, and other data from the antivirus and online security company Aura.
- Telus Corporation and Telus Digital: In March 2026, ShinyHunters claimed to have stolen over 1 petabyte (PB) of data from Telus and Telus Digital. The group demanded $65 million ransom in exchange for not leaking the company's data. The stolen data according to multiple prominent media outlets like Reuters and Bloomberg included ‌information related to more than two dozen companies that included personally identifiable information, call data and recordings (CDRs), FBI background check information, financial information, Salesforce data, and source code spanning multiple business divisions within the business services and telecommunications company. The stolen data also reportedly impacts Telus' telecommunication services; customers such as AWS, and call logs.
- European Commission: In March 2026, ShinyHunters hacked and leaked over 350GB of data from the EU Commission. PII, email communications, sensitive documents, technical data, data belonging to 42 internal clients and at least 29 EU entities, and more were affected according to CERT-EU which also attributed the breach and leak to ShinyHunters.
- Rockstar Games: In April 2026, ShinyHunters breached cloud-linked systems of Rockstar Games via a third-party service (Anodot → Snowflake), claiming to have stolen nearly 80 million records. The group issued a ransom deadline of April 14 and, after it expired, leaked portions of the data online, including internal analytics and business metrics (such as GTA Online and Red Dead Online performance data). Rockstar confirmed the breach and stated that only limited, non-material internal data was affected, with no impact on operations, services, or player data.
- ADT: In April 2026, ShinyHunters stole the personal information of 5.5 million individuals after breaching the systems of home security giant ADT. ShinyHunters was able to steal the personal information through an employee's compromised Okta single sign-on account via a voice phishing attack.
- Carnival Cruise: In April 2026, ShinyHunters stole the personal information of nearly 6 million people, including sensitive PII.
- Canvas: On May 7, 2026, ShinyHunters claimed responsibility for breaching Instructure again. The Canvas login page was changed to a message stating that affected schools had until May 12, 2026, to contact ShinyHunters via Tox to negotiate a settlement. As of May 11, 2026, Instructure has confirmed that they reached an "agreement" with the "unauthorized threat actor".
- JCPenney 2026 security incident: On June 1, ShinyHunters claimed responsibility for the 2026 hack of JCPenney retailers. Data was obtained from JCPenney through the exploitation of a critical zero-day vulnerability in Oracle PeopleSoft was later published publicly.
- University of Nottingham: In June 2026, ShinyHunters reportedly breached the University of Nottingham's Campus Solutions student records system, provided by Oracle.
- MSG Sports: In June 2026, the same day as the Knick's Finals run, ShinyHunters leaked 45GB worth of the customer and corporate records on the ShinyHunter's dark web blog after MSG Sports missed their ransom deadline.
- RingCentral: In July 2026, ShinyHunters released over 1.6 million customer records from cloud-based business communications platform RingCentral. The company posted a general advisory notice on July 28th 2026, acknowledging it had been compromised during a targeted attack.
- Federal Bureau of Investigation: In September 2026, ShinyHunters claimed responsibility for breaching multiple FBI-related services and stole data from 4,000 employees. ShinyHunters also made the FBI website to show the ShinyHunter's logo. The group stated that this attack was not financially motivated.
- Florida Department of Highway Safety and Motor Vehicles: In September 2026, ShinyHunters gained unauthorized access into Florida Department of Highway Safety and Motor Vehicles records.

== Details of some data breaches ==
=== Snowflake data hacks ===
In 2024, ShinyHunters claimed to have hacked Snowflake-related customers including Ticketmaster, Santander Bank, Neiman Marcus, and many others. The group was also responsible for publishing data stolen from Twilio and Truist Bank.

In 2026, ShinyHunters executed another widespread data theft of Snowflake-related customers through the third-party integrator Anodot. Snowflake, Inc. confirmed the incident and is actively notifying potentially impacted customers. Subsequently, ShinyHunters is extorting "more than a dozen" companies that were affected in return to not publish the data. Google's threat intelligence group Mandiant confirmed that they are tracking the case.

=== Salesforce data hacks ===
==== Round 1 ====
On June 4, 2025, ShinyHunters was tied to a widespread data-theft campaign targeting Salesforce cloud customers, which Google's Threat Intelligence team tracked as UNC6040. ShinyHunters, working in conjunction with Scattered Spider (now believed to be the same group) and Lapsus$ (also now believed to be the same group or a part of), impersonated IT support staff and used voice phishing calls to trick employees into installing a malicious version of Salesforce's Data Loader tool, allowing them to access and extract sensitive customer data by abusing OAuth to bypass traditional authentication methods. Following the successful intrusions, Google's Threat Intelligence team notes the victims of these intrusions receive an extortion or ransom email from ShinyHunters, which is also tracked as UNC6240.

This sophisticated social engineering approach led to confirmed data breaches at major companies including Google, Cisco, Adidas, Qantas, Allianz Life, Farmers Insurance Group, Workday, Pandora, Chanel, TransUnion, LVMH subsidiaries, including but not limited to Dior, Louis Vuitton, and Tiffany & Co.

==== Round 2 ====
Shortly after, on August 28, 2025, another campaign tracked by Google Threat Intelligence (formerly Mandiant) as UNC6395 used OAuth/refresh tokens stolen from Salesloft's Drift integration to access numerous Salesforce customer orgs between August 8–18, 2025, systematically exporting CRM data and hunting for credentials (e.g., AWS access keys, passwords, Snowflake tokens). Google told reporters it was aware of over 700 potentially impacted organizations. Public disclosures tied to this campaign include Cloudflare, Workiva, Zscaler, Tenable, CyberArk, Elastic, BeyondTrust, Proofpoint, JFrog, Rubrik, Cato Networks, and Palo Alto Networks, each confirming unauthorized access to data in their Salesforce environments following the Salesloft/Drift compromise. ShinyHunters claimed responsibility to the press.

On September 17, 2025, BleepingComputer was able to confirm ShinyHunters was behind the UNC6395 campaign, the biggest SaaS compromise in history. ShinyHunters told BleepingComputer that the threat actors used the TruffleHog security tool to scan the source code for secrets, which resulted in the finding of OAuth tokens for the Salesloft Drift and the Drift Email platforms. Using these stolen Drift OAuth tokens, the threat actors stole approximately 1.5 billion data records for 760 companies from the "Account", "Contact", "Case", "Opportunity", and "User" Salesforce object tables.

==== Round 3 ====
Three months later, on November 20, 2025, another campaign tracked by Google Threat Intelligence Group as UNC6395-adjacent actors known as ShinyHunters used OAuth/refresh tokens stolen from Gainsight Salesforce integration to access numerous customer instances.

Salesforce publicly reported detecting unusual activity related to applications published by Gainsight that were connected to its platform, leading Salesforce to revoke OAuth access and refresh tokens and temporarily remove related applications from its AppExchange while the investigation was ongoing.

The security incident bore extreme similarity to an earlier ShinyHunters-linked Salesloft Drift breach in August 2025, in which attackers stole OAuth tokens from the Salesloft integration known as Drift, enabling unauthorized access and data theft exfiltration of 760 customer Salesforce instances.

According to external reporting and industry analysis in a statement, Austin Larsen, the principal threat analyst of Google Threat Intelligence Group (formerly Mandiant), said that the company "is aware of more than 200 potentially affected Salesforce instances." This lined up with what ShinyHunters told several media outlets, specifically that there had been 285 Salesforce instances. The hacking group claimed responsibility for hacks affecting Atlassian, Docusign, F5, GitLab, Linkedin, Malwarebytes, SonicWall, Thomson Reuters, Verizon, and more.

==== Round 4 ====
On March 7, 2026, Salesforce released another security advisory linking a "known threat group" to exploiting misconfigurations in their Salesforce Experience Cloud software also known as Salesforce Aura using a modified version of Google-owned AuraInspector to scan for misconfigurations along with a custom developed tool by the "known threat group" to exploit and extract data from Experience Cloud misconfigurations.

Two days later, on March 9, 2026, ShinyHunters claimed responsibility for these data theft hacks on their data leak site warning affected victims to pay up or their data would be leaked. One IOC listed in the exploitation shared a similar User-Agent seen in ShinyHunters' Snowflake data theft attacks "RapeFlake" while in this case it was "RapeForce".

The hacking group claimed to have breached about 400 companies affecting Snowflake, Okta, Lastpass, Salesforce itself, Sony, AMD, and "a lot more".

Around the same time, the ShinyHunters also hacked the antivirus company Aura via social engineering.

=== 2025 Mixpanel data hacks ===
In November 2025, ShinyHunters was linked to a third-party analytics breach at Mixpanel. It affected multiple high-profile companies including Pornhub and OpenAI.

Threat actors exploited a smishing-based compromise of Mixpanel systems, resulting in the export of analytics-related datasets belonging to several customers. ShinyHunters subsequently leveraged this access to extort organizations, claiming to possess analytics records tied to platforms such as Pornhub's Premium service and, indirectly, data associated with OpenAI's API user interactions.

Both OpenAI and Pornhub confirmed that this breach was not a result of their own systems compromised but rather the third-party analytics breach at Mixpanel. Since then OpenAI does not use the analytics provider anymore.

=== 2026 Okta/SSO data hacks ===
In January 2026, ShinyHunters was linked by multiple media and threat-intelligence firms to a series of social-engineering campaigns targeted enterprise single sign-on (SSO) environments, including Okta. The attacks relied on voice-phishing ("vishing") and credential-harvesting infrastructure rather than exploitation of vulnerabilities in Okta's software, according to Okta and multiple security researchers.

According to a report by BleepingComputer, the ShinyHunters group claimed responsibility for a wave of voice-phishing ("vishing") campaigns that tricked employees into divulging their SSO credentials and multi-factor authentication codes. These credentials were subsequently used to access enterprise SSO dashboards and harvest data from connected software-as-a-service (SaaS) platforms for extortion purposes.

Okta itself publicly warned of active attacks in which threat actors used custom phishing kits and voice-based social engineering to steal SSO credentials, including Okta logins, and abuse those credentials to access cloud applications and exfiltrate data. Okta noted that these attacks did not exploit inherent vulnerabilities in its products, but instead leveraged sophisticated phishing techniques against individual users.

Threat-intelligence analysis published by Google Cloud's Threat Intelligence Group (formerly Mandiant) described how activity consistent with prior ShinyHunters-branded operations involved targeted voice-phishing and credential harvesting sites aimed at capturing SSO logins and MFA tokens. Once obtained, attackers could use the compromised SSO access to move laterally into applications such as Salesforce, Microsoft 365, and other enterprise services and then exfiltrate sensitive data. The analysis noted that some of the campaigns overlapped with ShinyHunters-branded activity tracked under multiple threat clusters.

This ongoing data theft campaign, as described by Charles Carmakal, CTO of Mandiant at Google Cloud, employs a sophisticated social engineering approach that has led to data breaches at major companies including, but not limited to, University of Pennsylvania, Princeton University, Harvard University, University of Nevada, Las Vegas, Grubhub, Crunchbase, Betterment, Panera Bread, Match Group, Tinder, Hinge, OkCupid, Bumble Inc, Odido, and Wynn Resorts.

According to a report by Silent Push, previously founded by FireEye, former owners of Mandiant, the ShinyHunters group and their broader collective "Scattered LAPSUS$ Hunters" ("SLH" / "SLSH") are actively targeting over 100 high-profile organizations in this campaign.

=== 2026 Oracle PeopleSoft data hacks ===
In June 2026, ShinyHunters was linked to a widespread data theft and extortion campaign targeting Oracle PeopleSoft servers, which claims to have stolen data from over 100+ organizations across 300+ instances as first reported by BleepingComputer.

ShinyHunters confirmed to BleepingComputer that they are using a "gadget chain" of old and zero-day vulnerabilities to exploit Oracle PeopleSoft servers.

University of Nottingham is believed to be one of the first confirmed victims of this campaign.

Mandiant and Google Threat Intelligence Group published a report on June 11, 2026, which corroborated ShinyHunters' claims to have compromised more than 100 organizations. Google said it spotted malicious activity consistent with the exploitation of CVE-2026-35273 between May 27 and June 9, and it subsequently notified more than 100 organizations who were potentially compromised.

In October 2026, the Zero Day Initiative, which had reported the flaw to Oracle in June, said that CVE-2026-35273 comprised three distinct vulnerabilities in PeopleSoft's Integration Gateway and Environment Management Hub, including a server-side request forgery, and that it was coordinating with Oracle to assign each a separate CVE identifier.

=== 2026 FBI data breach ===
In September 2026, ShinyHunters claimed responsibility for breaching the Federal Bureau of Investigation's jobs portal, FBIJobs.gov, and said it had obtained personal data on nearly all current and former FBI employees and job applicants (including names, home addresses, phone numbers, spouse info, assignment details, and medical records). The group told BleepingComputer it gained access by exploiting an Oracle PeopleSoft vulnerability before moving into FBI-managed AWS GovCloud infrastructure, and said the attack was retaliation for an FBI-issued advisory about the group, released earlier in the year. ShinyHunters gave the FBI a week to retract the advisory; its leak site went offline on September 30, a day after the deadline expired. Reuters could not determine why, and the FBI declined to say whether it had acted against the site.

The breach was followed by arrests in the Netherlands, Jordan, and the United States. In September 2026, Dutch police arrested Pepijn van der Stap, a 24-year-old whom the FBI described as one of the group's alleged leaders. According to KrebsOnSecurity, a member known as "Rey" then assumed control of the group and taunted the FBI over the stolen data; Reuters reported in early October that Rey, a teenager, had been detained in Jordan and was cooperating with investigators. KrebsOnSecurity reported that at the time of Rey's detention the group had been extorting Jeppesen ForeFlight, an aviation navigation business that Boeing had sold to Thoma Bravo; Boeing said it was reviewing the claims, and Jeppesen ForeFlight said it had seen no impact to its operations or products. The FBI said it had worked with partners to arrest multiple subjects, and the investigation was centralized in the Eastern District of Texas.

On October 8, 2026, FBI agents in Pennsylvania arrested a Canadian cybersecurity executive. Court records show he was charged with conspiracy to threaten to impair the confidentiality of information with intent to extort money and with Hobbs Act extortion and conspiracy; a magistrate judge in Philadelphia appointed a federal public defender, ordered him detained, and transferred the case to the Eastern District of Texas, where the complaint file remains under seal. FBI Director Kash Patel announced on October 9 that the bureau had arrested "another suspected co-conspirator" of ShinyHunters without naming the person, and the FBI has not publicly identified the defendant. According to a court transcript obtained by CBC News, the prosecutor said at the October 8 initial hearing that the defendant had been "working on behalf of the threat actors" and had engaged in a fraud involving his own clients, without directly referring to ShinyHunters or the FBI breach; his court-appointed lawyer described the allegations as "completely untested" and said he would contest the charges.

== Other data breaches ==
The following are other hacks that have been credited to or allegedly done by ShinyHunters. The estimated impacts of user records affected are also given, if possible.

- JusPay – 100 million user records
- Zoosk – 30 million user records
- Chatbooks – 15 million user records
- SocialShare – 6 million user records
- Home Chef – 8 million user records
- Minted – 5 million user records
- The Chronicle of Higher Education – 3 million user records
- GuMim – 2 million user records
- Mindful – 2 million user records
- Bhinneka – 1.2 million user records
- The Minnesota Star Tribune – 1 million user records
- Dave.com – 7.5 million users
- Drizly.com – 2.4 million user records
- Havenly – 1.3 million user records
- Hurb.com – 20 million user records
- Indabamusic – 475,000 user records
- Ivoy.mx – 127,000 user records
- Mathway – 25.8 million user records
- Proctoru – 444,000 user records
- Promo.com – 22 million user records
- Rewards1 – 3 million user records
- Scentbird – 5.8 million user records
- Swvl – 4 million user records
- Glofox – Unknown
- Truefire – 602,000 user records
- Vakinha – 4.8 million user records
- Appen.com – 5.8 million user records
- Styleshare – 6 million user records
- Bhinneka – 1.2 million user records
- Unacademy – 22 million user records
- Upstox – 111,000 user records
- Aditya Birla Fashion and Retail – 5.4 million user records
- Tokopedia – 91 million user records
- Wishbone – 40 million user records
- Wattpad – 270 million user records
- Pluto TV – 3.2 million user records
- Nitro PDF – 77 million user records
- Bonbos – 7 million user records
- BigBasket – 20 million user records
- AT&T (2021) – 71 million user records
- Ticketmaster – 560 million user records
- Santander – 30 million customer records
- Twilio (Authy) – 33.4 million user records
- Neiman Marcus – 31 million user records
- AT&T (2024) – 109 million records
- PowerSchool – 62 million user records
- Legal Aid Agency – 2.1 million user records
- Qantas – 5.7 million user records
- Google AdSense – 2.55 million user records
- Allianz Life – 1.5 million user records
- Farmers Insurance Group – 1.1 million user records
- TransUnion – 13 million user records
- Kering – 56.4 million user records
- Pornhub – 200 million records
- SoundCloud – 29.8 million user records
- Panera Bread – 5.1 million user records
- Betterment – 1.4 million user accounts
- Odido – 6.2 million user records
- Figure Technology Solutions – 967,000 user records
- CarGurus – 12.4 million user records
- Aura - 903,100 user records
- McGraw Hill Education - 13.5 million user records
- ADT Inc. - 5.5 million user records
- Carnival Cruise Line - 6 million user records
- Charter Communications - 4.9 million user records
- DentaQuest - 2.6 million user records

Totaling 1,798,509,000 not accounting for duplicate records between the aforementioned data breaches above.
