= Clef (app) =

San Francisco based technology company

Clef was a San Francisco-based technology company, known for developing a mobile app that created a two-factor authentication for websites. It allowed users to access sites with a single login password management service which stores encrypted passwords in private accounts. It had a standard verification method that requires access to data on the mobile phone to confirm the user's identity. The application required a Wi-Fi or mobile network, and the user could log in by scanning the computer screen with their phone.

== History ==
Clef was founded in 2013 by Mark Hudnall, B. Byrne and Jesse Pollak. It raised $1.6 million in seed funding in November 2014. Clef integrated with many websites and applications, including WordPress. On March 17, 2017, Clef announced they would no longer support the plugin after June 6, 2017; Clef was acquired by Twilio and some of its staff members were reassigned to Authy, Twilio's 2FA service.
