= SendGrid =

American email delivery service

Coordinates: 39.748150°N 104.999039°W

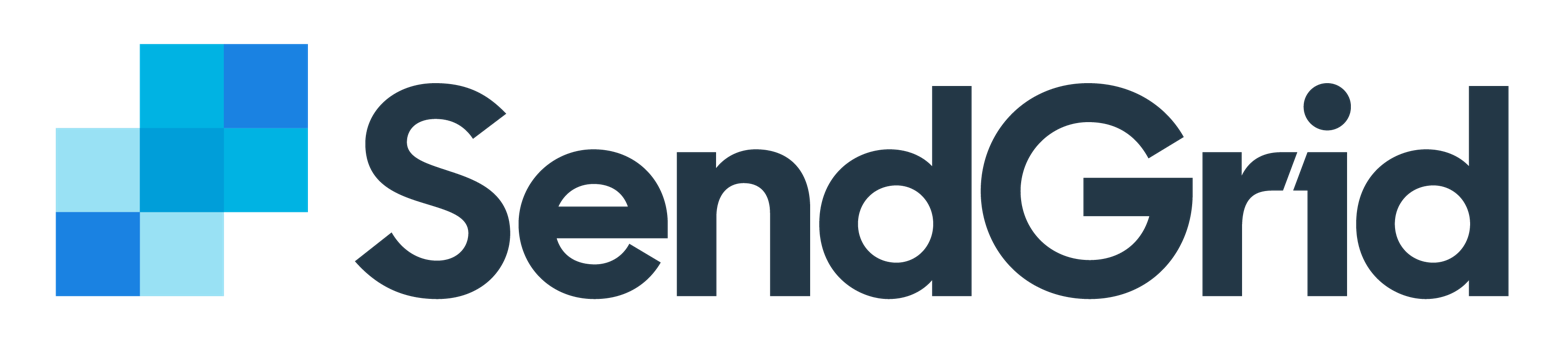

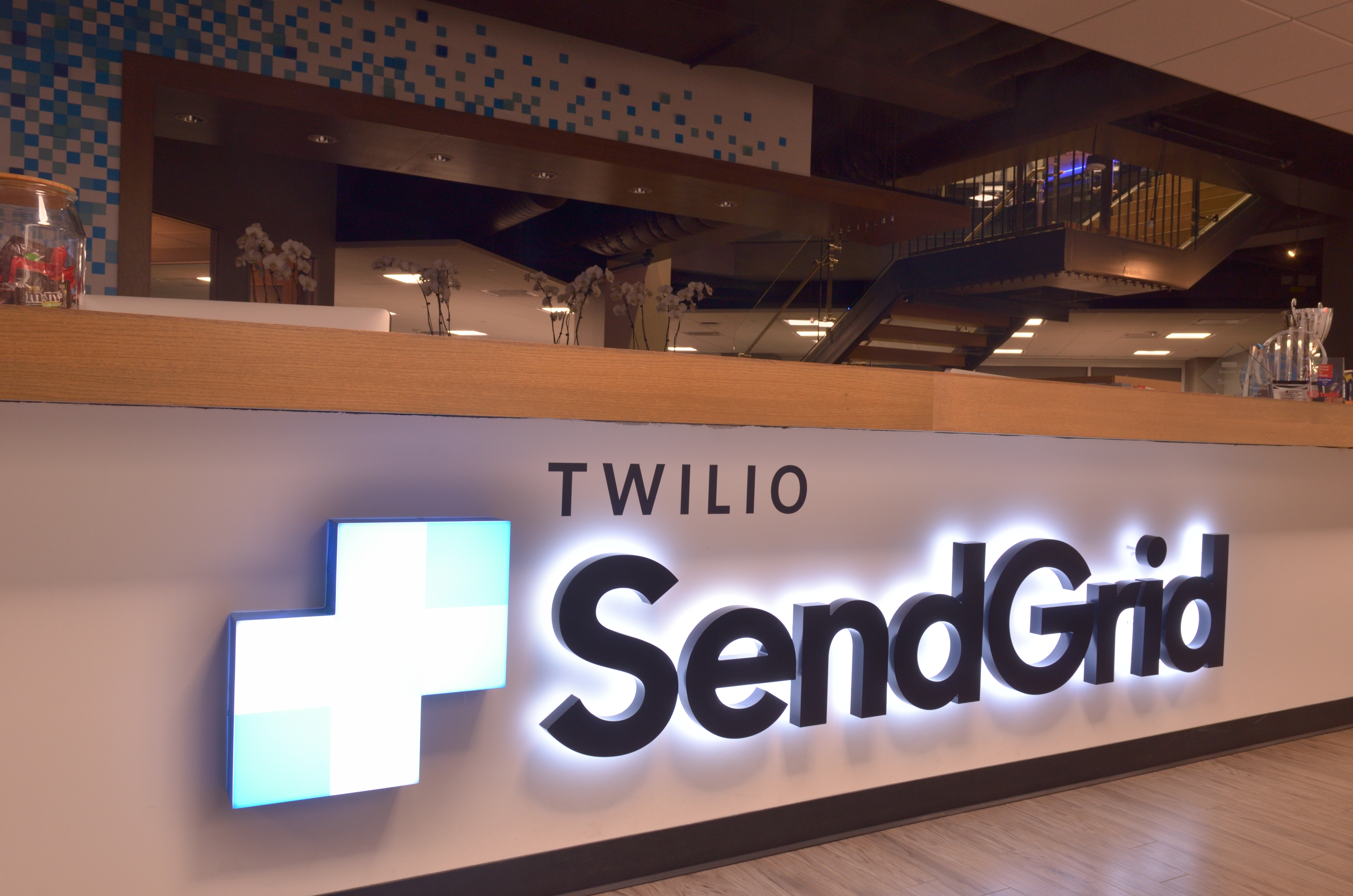
- SendGrid headquarters in Denver
- Type: Subsidiary
- Industry: Technology
- Founded: 2009
- Founder: Isaac Saldana; Jose Lopez; Tim Jenkins
- Headquarters: Denver, Colorado, United States
- Key people: Sameer Dholakia (CEO)
- Revenue: $111.9 million (2017)
- Parent: Twilio
- Website: twilio.com

Twilio SendGrid, commonly known as SendGrid, is an American communication platform for transactional and marketing email based in Denver, Colorado.

== History ==
SendGrid was founded in 2009 by Isaac Saldana, Jose Lopez, and Tim Jenkins. Later, it was incubated through the Techstars accelerator program. By December 2009, the company announced it had raised $750,000 in a funding round led by Highway 12 Ventures. Other participating investors included SoftTech VC, FF Angel, and TechStars founder David Cohen.

In April 2010, the email software-as-a-service (SaaS) company received $5 million in Series A round funding from Foundry Group, SoftTech VC, and Highway 12 Ventures, as well as individual investors including David Cohen, Scott Petry, Dave McClure, and Matt Mullenweg. Ryan McIntyre, the co-founder of Foundry, joined SendGrid's board of directors at this time as well.

In January 2012, SendGrid raised $21 million in Series B funding, led by Bessemer Venture Partners. In August 2012, SendGrid opened an office in Denver. In December 2012, SendGrid partnered with Twilio to incorporate SMS and push notification services to its platform.

In March 2013, the controversial firing of Adria Richards and the surrounding circumstances became known as Donglegate. In June 2013, SendGrid released its new email marketing service.

In September 2014, former Citrix executive Sameer Dholakia joined SendGrid as the CEO. In December 2014, SendGrid raised $20 million in Series C funding. The series C round was led by a new investor Bain Capital Ventures. Current investors Bessemer Venture Partners and Foundry Group also participated.

In November 2016, SendGrid raised $33 million in Series D funding. The round was led by Bain Capital Ventures, with participation from Bessemer Ventures and the Foundry Group.

SendGrid went public with a debut in the New York Stock Exchange on November 16, 2017.

In October 2018, Twilio announced plans to acquire SendGrid for $2 billion. Twilio completed its acquisition of SendGrid on February 1, 2019.

In May 2025, Twilio retired SendGrid's free email API plan and free marketing campaigns plan, requiring customers to transition to paid tiers. During Cyber Week 2025, SendGrid processed 75.1 billion emails, a 14.6% increase over the previous year's record. In February 2026, Twilio announced that the SendGrid.com website would be fully merged into Twilio.com, consolidating the brands after their 2019 acquisition.

== Platform ==
SendGrid provides a cloud-based service that assists businesses with email delivery. The service manages various types of email including shipping notifications, friend requests, sign-up confirmations, and email newsletters. It also handles Internet service provider (ISP) monitoring, domain keys, the sender policy framework (SPF), and feedback loops. Additionally, the company provides link tracking and open rate reporting. It also allows companies to track email opens, unsubscribes, bounces, and spam reports.

SendGrid offered a freemium version and a Lite Plan (pay-as-you-go), as well as three expanded levels of service: Essentials, Pro, and Premier, until it ended its free version in May 2025.
