= Twilio =

US cloud communications company

Twilio Inc.
- Company type: Public
- Traded as: NYSE: TWLO (Class A); S&P 500 component
- Founded: 2008; 18 years ago in Seattle, Washington, U.S.
- Headquarters: Rincon Center; San Francisco, California, U.S.
- Founders: Jeff Lawson; Evan Cooke; John Wolthuis
- Key people: Khozema Shipchandler (CEO); Inbal Shani (CPO & CTO); Thomas Wyatt (COO); Aidan Viggiano (CFO)
- Industry: Communications
- Products: Voice; SMS; MMS; SIP trunking; WebRTC; 2FA; Call Center
- Revenue: ▲US$5.07 billion (2025)
- Operating income: ▲US$158 million (2025)
- Net income: ▲US$33.8 million (2025)
- Total assets: ▼US$9.77 billion (2025)
- Total equity: ▼US$7.82 billion (2025)
- Employees: 5,587 (2025)
- Subsidiaries: Authy; SendGrid
- Website: twilio.com
- ASN: 394434

Twilio Inc. is an American cloud communications and customer engagement company based in San Francisco, California, which provides programmable communication tools for making and receiving phone calls, sending and receiving text messages, and performing other communication functions using conversational AI and its web service APIs. Founded in 2008, the company went public in 2016. Twilio has acquired a number of companies since 2015, including the two-factor authentication service Authy and email marketing platform SendGrid.

== History ==
Twilio was founded in 2008 by University of Michigan graduates Jeff Lawson, Evan Cooke, and John Wolthuis and was based initially in Seattle and San Francisco. On November 20, 2008, the company launched Twilio Voice, an API to make and receive phone calls completely hosted in the cloud. Twilio's text messaging API was released in February 2010, and SMS shortcodes were released in public beta in July 2011.

Twilio is known for using platform evangelism to acquire customers. An early example is GroupMe, which was founded in May 2010 at the hackathon of TechCrunch Disrupt and uses Twilio's text messaging product to facilitate group chat. GroupMe raised $10.6 million in venture funding in January 2011. Seed accelerator 500 Startups (now 500 Global) announced the Twilio Fund, a $250,000 "micro-fund" to provide seed money to startups using Twilio in September 2010.

Before going public, Twilio raised approximately $233 million in venture capital growth funding, receiving its first round of seed funding in March 2009 for an undisclosed amount, led by Mitch Kapor and Founders Fund. The company's series A round of funding was led by Union Square Ventures for $3.7 million, and its series B round of funding, for $12 million, was led by Bessemer Venture Partners. Twilio received $17 million in a Series C round in December 2011 from Bessemer Venture Partners and Union Square Ventures. In July 2013, Twilio received $70 million in a series D round led by Redpoint Ventures and Bessemer Venture Partners. In July 2015, Twilio raised $130 million in a series E round led by Fidelity and T Rowe Price. Twilio's initial public offering took place on the New York Stock Exchange on June 23, 2016, with a 92% increase in share price on the first day.

In March 2020, Twilio announced the appointment of Steve Pugh as Chief Security Officer and Glenn Weinstein as Chief Customer Officer. In 2021, Twilio shut down its links to Parler due to Parler refusing to agree to monitor hate speech and insurrection on its platform.

In September 2022, Twilio laid off 11% of its workforce, and then in February 2023, laid off an additional 17%. As a part of restructuring, the company also announced the creation of two business units – Twilio Data & Applications and Twilio Communications.

Twilio founder Jeff Lawson stepped down as CEO and board member in January 2024 and was succeeded by Khozema Shipchandler, a longtime Twilio executive.

== Acquisitions ==
In February 2015, Twilio acquired Authy, a Y Combinator–backed startup that offers two-factor authentication (2FA) services to end users, developers and enterprises.

The company acquired Tikal Technologies, the development team behind the Kurento WebRTC open-source media server software, for $8.5 million in September 2016.

In February 2017, Twilio acquired Beepsend, a Swedish-based SMS messaging provider, for an undisclosed amount. Twilio acquired the Clef 2FA application in March 2017, after which Clef was discontinued and some of its employees were reassigned to Authy products.

Twilio announced in September 2018 that it was acquiring Ytica, a Prague–based speech analytics firm, for an undisclosed amount. In October of that year, Twilio announced it was acquiring SendGrid, a Denver, Colorado-based customer communication platform for transactional and marketing email, for $2 billion. In February 2019, the two companies were formally merged in a deal valued at $3 billion. In November 2018, the company acquired Core Network Dynamics GmbH, a Berlin, Germany-based virtual evolved packet core company.

Twilio announced in July 2020 that it had acquired Electric Imp, an internet of things platform company, for an undisclosed amount. In October of that year, the company acquired Segment, a platform to collect, clean, and activate customer data, for $3.2 billion.

In May 2021, Twilio acquired Ionic Security, a data security platform for $30.2 million, and Zipwhip, a toll-free messaging services provider, for $850 million.

In January 2022, Twilio announced that it agreed to acquire Boku Identity, Inc. from Boku, Inc. for $32.3 million.

In November 2025, Twilio announced it had acquired Stytch, an identity platform for AI agents.

== Technology ==
Twilio uses Amazon Web Services to host its communication infrastructure via APIs. Rather than using industry-standard protocols such as SIP for call control, Twilio uses a customized markup language known as TwiML to allow for direct integration with its services. Twilio and the customer typically exchange TwiML documents via HTTP Webhook.

In June 2010, Twilio launched OpenVBX, an open-source product that lets business users configure phone numbers to receive and route phone calls. One month later, Twilio engineer Kyle Conroy released Stashboard, an open-source status dashboard written in the Python programming language that any API or software service can use to display whether their service is functioning properly.

Twilio Segment, its customer data platform for developers, collects, cleans, unifies, and routes customer data across websites, mobile apps, and the cloud. Twilio Console is the platform's hub. It was redesigned in 2026 for developer productivity, and features an AI assistant for real-time support. It includes product navigation, compliance management, and billing, the ability to try out new Twilio products, and Twilio Email, which is built on SendGrid technology.

In May 2026, Twilio launched four new capabilities for its customer engagement platform. The conversation layers connect and retain information between AI and human agents across chat, email, and voice interactions, so that conversations do not begin from scratch and carry over from one interaction to the next. The new layers also use generative AI to turn live conversations into real-time intelligence regarding the level of customer satisfaction, and include an open-source framework connecting AI agents to Twilio's voice and messaging channels. Also in May 2026, Twilio announced a partnership with Stripe, for developers to use Twilio services directly within Stripe's CLI workflow.

== Security incidents ==
Twilio was subject to two data breaches in 2022 and a third in 2024. The company suffered a data breach on June 29, 2022, after a Twilio employee was tricked into revealing their access credentials in a voice phishing attack; Twilio stated that the attacker gained access to customer data for less than 12 hours. On August 4, 2022, attackers accessed Twilio's internal network through an SMS phishing campaign targeting their employees. Twilio confirmed the data breach three days later. On August 15, Signal – which used Twilio for phone number validation – announced that it had been impacted by the breach, indicating that about 1,900 customers were affected, including enterprise accounts. The hackers obtained the data of 209 Twilio customers and compromised 93 accounts on Authy, Twilio's 2FA service, while registering their own devices to the accounts.

In a July 2024 data breach, the ShinyHunters hacker group used an unsecured Twilio API to acquire the phone numbers of over 33 million Authy users. In response, Twilio stopped allowing unauthenticated requests.
