= November 2026 FBI hackings =

Cyberattack on the FBI in 2026

- Date: November 21, 2026
- Type: Data breach
- Target: FBI
- Perpetrator: Unknown

On November 21, 2026, the FBI was reported to have been hacked. Specifically, the National Crime Information Center (NCIC) was involved in a cyberattack.

== See also ==
- 2026 FBI data breach
