= Uncork Capital =

American venture capital firm

- Type: Private
- Industry: Venture Capital
- Founded: 2004; 22 years ago
- Headquarters: San Francisco, CA, United States
- Key people: Jeff Clavier, Founder and Managing Partner; Andy McLoughlin, Managing Partner
- Products: Investments
- Website: uncorkcapital.com

Uncork Capital (formerly known as SoftTech VC) is an American venture capital firm based in San Francisco, California, that was founded by Jeff Clavier. It invested in companies such as Postmates, Eventbrite, Fitbit, and SendGrid.

== History ==
The firm was founded in 2004 by angel investor Jeff Clavier when he transitioned his portfolio into a formal venture firm. Partners include Andy McLoughlin (formerly of Huddle), Susan Liu (formerly of Scale Venture Partners), Tripp Jones (formerly of August Capital), and Amy Saper (formerly of Accel). As of 2024, the firm had invested in over 260 early stage start-ups.

In 2017, the firm changed its name from SoftTech VC to Uncork Capital.

== Investments ==
The firm primarily invests in SaaS (software as a service), developer tooling, marketplaces, consumer services and "frontier technology" ventures. With a focus on seed-stage funding, the firm generally aims to secure between 10-15% ownership of the companies it invests in.

Current active investments include LaunchDarkly, Human Interest, Loft Orbital, ClassDojo, Carrot Fertility, Front, Shippo, Hallow, Numeral, and GPTZero. In July 2018, Uncork Capital participated in a $14 million investment into a market research company, Survata in a Series B round led by Conductive Ventures, along with PivotNorth, Ridge Ventures, Bloomberg Beta, Initialized Capital and other individual investors.

The firm's first fund raised less than $1 million, while the second fund raised $15 million in 2007. In 2012, Fund III oversubscribed at $55 million, and, in 2014, they closed their fourth fund at $85 million, bringing their capital under management to $155 million. In 2016, the firm raised $100 million for SoftTechVC V and $50 million for a breakout fund. In 2019, the firm raised $100M for Uncork VI and $100M for their second breakout fund, Plus II. In 2023, the firm raised $200M for Uncork VII and $200M for their third breakout fund, Plus III. In 2025, the firm raised $225M for Uncork VIII and $75M for their fourth breakout fund, Plus IV.
