= Coreflood =

Computer trojan and botnet

Coreflood is a trojan horse and botnet created by a group of Russian hackers and released in 2010. The FBI included on its list of infected systems "approximately 17 state or local government agencies, including one police department; three airports; two defense contractors; five banks or financial institutions; approximately 30 colleges or universities; approximately 20 hospital or health care companies; and hundreds of businesses."

Backdoor.Coreflood is a trojan horse that opens a back door on the compromised computer. It acts as a keylogger and gathers user information. In May 2011, it was present on more than 2.3 million computers worldwide.

In April 2011, the FBI announced the capability, and authorization from the courts, to delete Coreflood from infected computers after receiving written consent. The FBI reduced the size of the botnet by 90% in the United States and 75% around the world.
