= Mixpanel =

Business analytics company

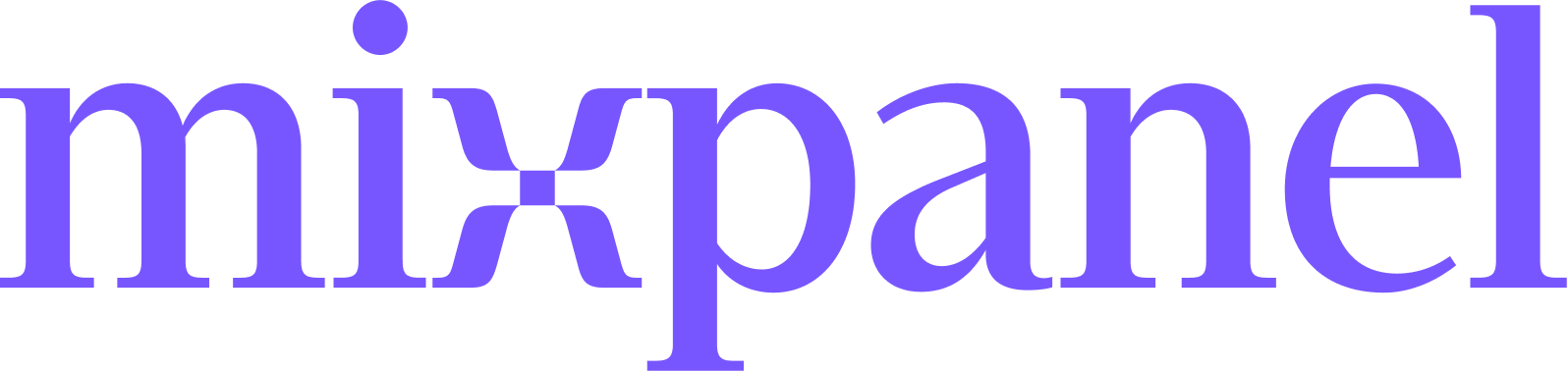
- Type: Private
- Industry: SaaS, Analytics
- Founded: 2009
- Founder: Suhail Doshi, Tim Trefren
- Headquarters: San Francisco, California, United States
- Key people: Jen Taylor (CEO)
- Products: Product analytics, Event tracking, Marketing analytics
- Website: https://mixpanel.com/

Mixpanel is a digital analytics service company that tracks user interactions with web and mobile applications. The platform provides product analytics capabilities, including event tracking, user segmentation, retention analysis, and funnel analysis. Data collected is used to build custom reports and measure user engagement and retention.

Mixpanel was founded by Suhail Doshi and Tim Trefren in 2009 and is based in San Francisco, California. It is backed by Y Combinator, and its investors include Andreessen Horowitz, Max Levchin, and Keith Rabois. As of 2021, Mixpanel reached unicorn status with a valuation exceeding $1 billion.

== History ==
=== Founding and early funding (2009–2012) ===
Mixpanel was founded in 2009 by Suhail Doshi and Tim Trefren. The company was accepted into Y Combinator's Summer 2009 batch.

In May 2012, Mixpanel raised a $10.25 million Series A round led by Andreessen Horowitz. The funding was accompanied by public advocacy from Andreessen Horowitz for "actionable metrics" in product development.

=== Growth and Series B (2014) ===
In December 2014, Mixpanel raised a $65 million Series B round, also led by Andreessen Horowitz, at a pre-money valuation of $800 million. By 2013, the platform was analyzing more than 15 billion user actions per month.

=== Leadership transition and unicorn status (2018–2021) ===
In April 2018, founder and CEO Suhail Doshi announced he would step down and become chairman of the board. He was replaced as CEO by Amir Movafaghi, a former Twitter executive.

In November 2021, Mixpanel raised a $200 million Series C round from Bain Capital Tech Opportunities at a $1.05 billion valuation, achieving unicorn status.

=== Product expansion and recent developments (2023–present) ===
In May 2023, Mixpanel launched Mixpanel Marketing Analytics.

In September 2025, Jen Taylor was appointed CEO, succeeding Amir Movafaghi.

In October 2025, Mixpanel acquired DoubleLoop, an AI strategy development business, for an undisclosed amount. DoubleLoop uses AI to support the process of surfacing and structuring metrics and operates a Metric Trees product to help visualize company metrics.

== Funding and investors ==
Mixpanel has raised approximately $277 million in total funding across multiple rounds since its founding in 2009. The company's investors include Y Combinator, Andreessen Horowitz, Bain Capital Tech Opportunities, Sequoia Capital, Max Levchin, and Keith Rabois.

Round	Date	Amount	Lead Investor	Valuation	Source
Seed	2009–2011	$1.8M	Y Combinator, Max Levchin	—	
Series A	May 2012	$10.25M	Andreessen Horowitz	—	
Series B	December 2014	$65M	Andreessen Horowitz	$865M	
Series C	November 2021	$200M	Bain Capital Tech Opportunities	$1.05B	

The Series A round in 2012 was led by Andreessen Horowitz. The Series B round in 2014 valued the company at $865 million pre-money. In November 2021, Mixpanel raised a $200 million Series C investment from Bain Capital Tech Opportunities at a $1.05 billion valuation. This funding round occurred seven years after the previous venture investment.

== Leadership ==
Mixpanel was co-founded by Suhail Doshi and Tim Trefren in 2009. Doshi was CEO from 2009 until April 2018, when he became chairman.

Amir Movafaghi succeeded Doshi as CEO in April 2018. Movafaghi previously held positions at Twitter and Spiceworks. He was CEO until September 2025, when he transitioned to an advisory role.

Jen Taylor became CEO in September 2025. Taylor previously held executive positions at Plaid, Cloudflare, Salesforce, Facebook, and Adobe.

== Product and technology ==
=== Event-based analytics ===
Mixpanel's technology is built on event-based analytics, which tracks specific user interactions such as button clicks, video plays, and sign-ups, rather than traditional page-view metrics. This approach differs from traditional web analytics platforms like Google Analytics, which historically focused on page-view tracking.

The platform tracks individual user journeys across devices and sessions rather than treating each visit as an isolated event.

=== Features ===
Mixpanel provides analytics capabilities, including user segmentation, cohort analysis, funnel analysis, and retention tracking. User segmentation groups users based on behaviors, demographics, or custom properties. Cohort analysis tracks groups of users over time to measure retention and engagement. Funnel analysis visualizes user progression through multi-step processes, while retention tracking measures how often users return to an application over time.

== Mixpanel security incident (2025) ==
In November 2025, OpenAI and CoinTracker disclosed that their third-party analytics provider Mixpanel had experienced a security incident involving unauthorized access to part of Mixpanel’s systems. According to OpenAI and CoinTracker, an attacker exported a dataset containing limited customer-identifiable analytics information. Exposed data included names and email addresses associated with API accounts, coarse location metadata, browser and operating-system details, referring websites and organization or user IDs (for OpenAI) and limited transaction summaries (for CoinTracker). No chat data, API request content, logs, passwords, API keys, payment information, wallet addresses, recovery phrases, private keys, tax forms, exchange-connected transaction data, bank account or credit card information, Social Security numbers or other government-issued IDs, or other sensitive data were affected.

OpenAI and CoinTracker removed Mixpanel from its production environments, began notifying impacted users, and initiated a broader review of external vendors. Mixpanel stated that the incidents resulted from a targeted SMS-based social-engineering attack and said it had revoked sessions, rotated credentials, blocked malicious IPs, and engaged external cybersecurity investigators. OpenAI and CoinTracker advised affected users to remain vigilant against phishing or social-engineering attempts.

== General references ==
- Gage, Deborah (September 10, 2014). "In 'Unicorn Hire,' Mixpanel Lures Top Sales Executive From New Relic". The Wall Street Journal.
- Lawler, Ryan (July 29, 2013). "Now Analyzing More Than 15 Billion Actions A Month, Mixpanel Launches A Big Marketing Campaign And A Conference About Analytics". TechCrunch.
- Birani, B.; Birani, M. (2016). iOS Forensics Cookbook. Packt Publishing. p. 53–. ISBN 978-1-78528-535-6. (subscription required)
