= Okta, Inc. =

American information technology company

- Logo since 2022

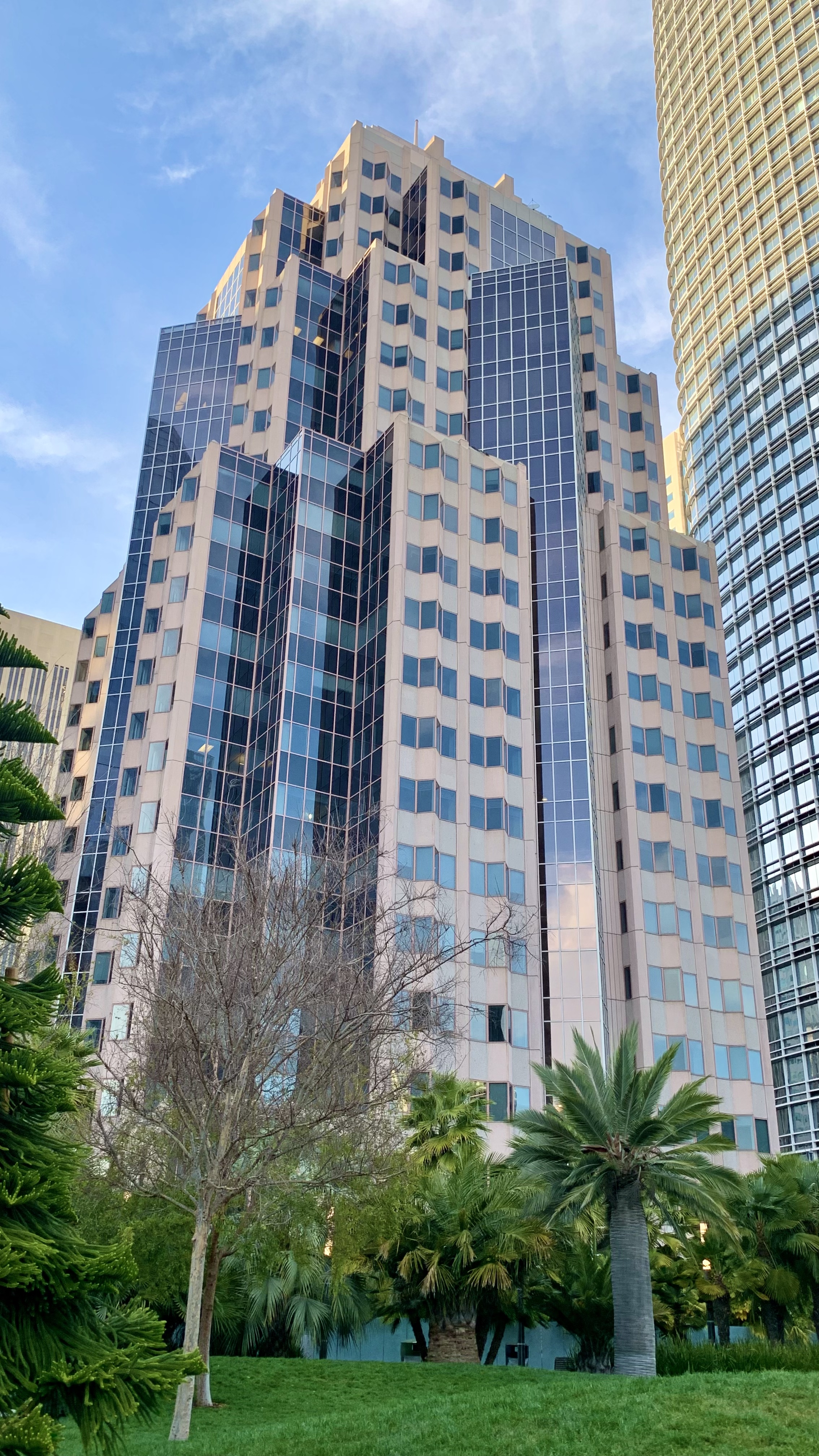
- Headquarters at 100 First Plaza in San Francisco
- Formerly: SaaSure Inc. (2009–2010)
- Type: Public
- Traded as: Nasdaq: OKTA (Class A); S&P 500 component
- Industry: Software
- Founded: January 2009; 17 years ago
- Founders: Todd McKinnon; Frederic Kerrest
- Headquarters: 100 First Plaza; San Francisco, California, U.S.
- Area served: Worldwide
- Key people: Todd McKinnon (CEO); Eric Kelleher (COO)
- Products: Single Sign-On
- Revenue: ▲US$2.92 billion (2026)
- Operating income: ▲US$149 million (2026)
- Net income: ▲US$235 million (2026)
- Total assets: ▲US$9.71 billion (2026)
- Total equity: ▲US$6.99 billion (2026)
- Number of employees: 6,366 (2026)
- Website: okta.com
- Footnotes; Financials as of January 31, 2026.

Okta, Inc. (formerly SaaSure Inc.) is an American identity and access management company based in San Francisco. It provides cloud software that helps companies manage and secure user authentication into applications, and for developers to build identity controls into applications, websites, web services, and devices. It was founded in 2009 and had its initial public offering in 2017, reaching a valuation of over $6 billion.

== Products and services ==
Okta sells six services, including a single-sign-on service that allows users to log into a variety of systems using a single centralized process; for example, the company claims the ability to log into Gmail, Workday, Salesforce, and Slack with one login. It also offers API authentication services.

Okta's services are built on the Amazon Web Services cloud.

Okta runs an annual “Oktane” user conference, which in 2018 featured former US President Barack Obama as a keynote speaker.

== History ==
Okta was co-founded in 2009 as SaaSure Inc. by Todd McKinnon and Frederic Kerrest, who previously worked together at Salesforce. In 2010, it changed its name to Okta, from the meteorological unit for cloud cover.

In 2015, the company raised US$75 million in venture capital from Andreessen Horowitz, Greylock Partners, and Sequoia Capital, at a total initial valuation of US$1.2 billion.

In 2017, Okta held its initial public offering (IPO), opening on Nasdaq at $17.00 per share, trading up on its first day, to raise an additional US$187 million. At the time of its IPO, Sequoia Capital was the biggest shareholder, with a 21.2 percent stake.

In January 2019, Okta reported over 100 million registered users.

In March 2021, Okta signed a definitive agreement to acquire Auth0 for $6.5 billion. The deal closed in May 2021. In August 2021, Okta acquired atSpoke for $90 million. In December 2023, Okta acquired security firm Spera for approximately $100–130 million.

== Recent developments ==
In September 2025, Okta completed its acquisition of Axiom Security, a provider of identity-centric privileged access management (PAM) for cloud, SaaS, and database environments. The technology was integrated into Okta Privileged Access as part of the company's broader Identity Security Fabric strategy.

Also in September 2025, Okta announced new platform capabilities enabling organizations to build secure agentic AI agents woven into an identity security fabric for end-to-end lifecycle management, including Identity Security Posture Management for identifying risky agents and exposed credentials. The company announced that Okta for AI Agents would become generally available on April 30, 2026.

== Security incidents ==
On March 9, 2021, hacking collective "Advanced Persistent Threat 69420" breached an Okta office network through a security failure in the company's Verkada camera setup. They were able to download security footage from the cameras. One member of the group, Maia Arson Crimew, also revealed that the group had gained root shell access to the network. In a blog post the next-day, Okta Chief Security Officer David Bradbury minimized the root shell as an "internal support tool" of the camera manufacturer Verkada. However, the shell would have given the hackers full access to execute any commands on the network, and Cloudflare admitted that a similar hack by the group on that company's network provided them with the same level of access. Bradbury also said that the threat was contained to an isolated network.

On March 22, 2022, the hacking group LAPSUS$ posted screenshots claiming to be from Okta internal systems. The next day, Okta concluded that a maximum of 366 of its customers data may potentially have been impacted, further stating that the breach originated with a computer used by one of Okta's third-party customer support engineers to which the hackers had access.

In December 2022, Okta's source code was stolen when a hacker gained access to its GitHub repository.

In early October 2023, Okta was notified of a breach resulting in hackers stealing HTTP access tokens from Okta's support platform by BeyondTrust. Okta denied the incident for a number of weeks, but later recognized that a breach had occurred. Customers impacted by the Okta breach included Caesars Entertainment, MGM Resorts International, 1Password, and Cloudflare. On November 29, 2023, it became known that the security incident affected all Okta customers.

== Sponsorship ==
In January 2025, Okta was signed as an official partner of McLaren in a multi-year deal.
