= National Cyber Investigative Joint Task Force =

US-based cybersecurity organization

The National Cyber Investigative Joint Task Force (NCIJTF) was officially established in 2008. The NCIJTF comprises over 30 partnering agencies from across law enforcement, the intelligence community, and the Department of Defense, with representatives who are co-located and work jointly to accomplish the organization's mission.

Since 2008, NCIJTF has been the primary American agency responsible for coordinating cyber threats investigations, and liaises with the Central Intelligence Agency (CIA), Department of Defense (DOD), Department of Homeland Security (DHS) and National Security Agency (NSA).

As a multi-agency cyber center, the NCIJTF has the primary responsibility to coordinate, integrate and share information to support cyber threat investigations, supply and support intelligence analysis for community decision-makers, and provide value to other ongoing efforts in the fight against cyber threats to the nation.

The NCIJTF also synchronizes joint efforts that focus on identifying, pursuing, and defeating the actual terrorists, spies, and criminals who seek to exploit the US's systems. To accomplish this, the task force leverages the collective authorities and capabilities of its members and collaborates with international and private sector partners to bring all available resources to bear against domestic cyber threats and their perpetrators.

Through the coordination, collaboration and sharing that occurs at the NCIJTF, members across the U.S. government work toward placing cyber criminals behind bars and removing them from the nation's networks. The NCIJTF follows both the letter and the spirit of the law to ensure that the privacy rights of all Americans are protected throughout the course of the investigations and efforts that it coordinates and supports.
