= Scattered Spider =

British-American hacking group

Scattered Spider, ShinyHunters
- Nickname: See § Names
- Formation: c. May 2022
- Type: Hacker group
- Purpose: Ransomware, cyberattacks, data theft extortion
- Region served: United States and United Kingdom
- Methods: Social engineering, ransomware as a service, password cracking
- Affiliations: ALPHV, ShinyHunters

Scattered Spider, also referred to as UNC3944 and more recently identified as ShinyHunters, is a hacking group mostly made up of teens and young adults believed to live in the United States and the United Kingdom. The group is believed to be affiliated with cybercriminal network "The Com", or more specifically "the Hacker Com", a subset of The Com.

The group gained notoriety for their involvement in the hacking and extortion of Caesars Entertainment and MGM Resorts International, two of the largest casino and gambling companies in the United States. Scattered Spider has also targeted Visa, Marks & Spencer, PNC Financial Services, Transamerica, New York Life Insurance, Synchrony Financial, Truist Bank, Twilio, and JLR.

Members of Scattered Spider have been connected with the hacks against Snowflake cloud storage customers in the US. More recently, members of Scattered Spider have been connected with the hacks against Qantas, the flag carrier of Australia.

A collective of cybercrime groups, including Scattered Spider, Lapsus$ and ShinyHunters was forged in 2025, and has created at least 16 Telegram channels since August 8, 2025.

== Names ==
The group's most common name as used in press releases and by journalists is Scattered Spider, though many other names have been attributed to the group. Star Fraud, Octo Tempest, Scatter Swine, and Muddled Libra have all been names used to refer to the group previously.

Scattered Spider is a component of a larger global hacking community, known as "The Community" or "The Com", itself having members who have hacked major American technology companies.

== History ==
Scattered Spider is believed to have been founded in May 2022, when the group was focused on attacks on telecommunications firms. The group utilized SIM swap scams, multi-factor authentication fatigue attacks, and phishing by SMS and Telegram. The group typically exploited the security bug CVE-2015-2291, a cybersecurity issue in Windows' anti-DoS software, to terminate security software, allowing the group to evade detection. The group is believed to have a deep understanding of Microsoft Azure, the ability to conduct reconnaissance in cloud computing platforms powered by Google Workspace and AWS, and utilizes legitimately-developed remote-access tools.

The group later became known for targeting critical infrastructure prior to moving on to its 2023 casino hacks. In 2025, DataBreaches.net reported that Scattered Spider had merged with ShinyHunters or vice versa.

== Casino hacks (2023) ==
Scattered Spider gained access to both Caesars' and MGM's internal systems through the use of social engineering. The group was able to bypass multi-factor authentication technologies by obtaining login credentials and one-time passwords. The group claims that it targeted MGM due to them catching the group attempting to rig slot machines in their favors.

=== Caesars ===
In 2023, Caesars Entertainment paid a ransom of $15 million to Scattered Spider, half their original demand of $30 million. Scattered Spider, using similar tactics to its attack on MGM, was able to access driver's license numbers and possibly Social Security numbers, for a "significant number" of Caesars' customers. Statements made by Caesars noted that while the company cannot guarantee the deletion of the information attained by Scattered Spider, the casino operator will take all necessary actions to attain such result.

Sources dispute on whether Scattered Spider was the group which targeted Caesars, with some believing it was the British-American group while others say the perpetrators were not the group or unknown.

=== MGM Resorts ===
Scattered Spider collaborated with ALPHV, a software development team which provides ransomware as a service. Scattered Spider called MGM's help desk posing as an employee it found on LinkedIn to gain internal access. The group gained access on September 11, 2023.

MGM Resorts first disclosed the cyberattack on September 12, 2023, in a Form 8-K report with the SEC the next day. The company stated that though it has "dealt" with the cyberattack, many of the computer systems at its resorts remain offline, which include but are not limited to credits for food, beverages, and free credits. The attack further disabled on-site ATMs as well as remote room keys, and prevented MGM from charging patrons for parking.

In July 2024, a 17-year-old hacker from the United Kingdom was arrested in connection with the hack and attempted ransom. He has been released on bail pending trial. The arrest was coordinated by local and international law enforcement.

=== Aftermath ===
MGM and the U.S. FTC and FBI are at present investigating the cyberattack, and the casino operator temporarily took down its website. Moody's Corporation has stated that due to MGM's heavy reliance on computers for much of its operations, its credit rating could go down as a result of the cyberattack. Upon the announcement of both companies' attacks, the stock prices for both Caesars and MGM dropped. MGM's CEO William Hornbuckle went on to note at an industry conference that the hack caused the company to be "completely in the dark" about its properties.

In September 2023, both MGM and Caesars were sued in class action lawsuits by customers following the hacks, with all stating that the failure for both of the casino operators to adequately secure their data constituted breach of contract. The law firms' clients also all demanded jury trials. In January 2025, MGM agreed to pay a $45 million settlement to the victims of the breach.

== Snowflake hacks ==
Two members of the group have been connected with hacks against customers of Snowflake's cloud computing. The hackers accessed and stole customer data, demanding millions of dollars. Nearly a hundred victims were targeted, including AT&T, Ticketmaster, Advance Auto Parts, LendingTree and Neiman Marcus.

== Arrests ==
In January 2024, Noah Michael Urban, a member of the group and known as "Sosa", "King Bob", "Elijah", and other aliases, was arrested in Florida for the cumulative theft of about $800,000 in cryptocurrency. Sosa used SIM-swapping techniques in order to compromise victims' email and financial account details. In August 2025, Urban, then 20, was sentenced to 10 years in prison and ordered to pay restitution of $13 million to more than 30 victims; he had pleaded guilty in April to several counts involving stolen cryptocurrency and confidential company files.

In June 2024, the alleged leader of the group, Tyler Buchanan (aka TylerB), was arrested in Spain when attempting to board a flight to Italy. At the time of his arrest, Spanish police allege that Buchanan possessed Bitcoins worth $27 million.

In July 2024, the West Midlands Police with the help of the FBI arrested a 17-year-old juvenile in connection with the MGM cyberattacks. The suspect, who lives in Walsall and whose name was not published, was released on bail while law enforcement examined his devices.

In November 2024, 19-year-old Remington Ogletree was arrested on charges related to his alleged involvement with the group.

On July 10, 2025, the National Crime Agency (NCA) arrested four people suspected of involvement in the cyberattacks on Marks & Spencer, Co-op and Harrods: two young men from the West Midlands, a 17-year-old British national and a 19-year-old Latvian national; a 19-year-old British man from London; and a 20-year-old British woman from Staffordshire. All four were held on suspicion of offenses under the Computer Misuse Act, as well as blackmail, money laundering and taking part in an organized crime group.

On September 17, 2025, a juvenile suspect local to the casino-hacking case surrendered to Clark County Juvenile Detention Center.

In September 2025, British teenager Thalha Jubair, 19, was arrested at his home in East London; he and 18-year-old Owen Flowers were accused of involvement in the 2024 cyberattack on Transport for London, which the National Crime Agency attributed to Scattered Spider. The US Department of Justice also unsealed charges filed in New Jersey accusing Jubair of computer hacking, extortion and money laundering. Prosecutors alleged he was involved in attacks on at least 120 companies, including 47 in the United States, and that victims had paid more than $115 million in ransoms.

On April 10, 2026, Peter Stokes, a 19-year-old Estonian-US dual citizen known by the online alias "Bouquet", was apprehended at Helsinki Airport in Finland while attempting to board a flight to Japan. US federal prosecutors requested his extradition to Chicago, charging him with wire fraud, conspiracy, and computer intrusion across at least four Scattered Spider operations.

== See also ==
- LockBit
- Lapsus$
- ShinyHunters
