= The Dark Overlord =

The Dark Overlord may refer to:

- Antagonist in Howard the Duck (film)
- The Dark Overlord (hackers), hacking group
