= Taringa =

Taringa may refer to:

- Taringa, Queensland, a western suburb of Brisbane
- Taringa (gastropod), a genus of sea slugs
- Taringa!, an Argentine social networking site
