= Aleksanteri Kivimäki =

Finnish cybercriminal

- Born: Julius Aleksanteri Tomminpoika Kivimäki; 22 August 1997 (age 29); Espoo, Finland
- Other names: zeekill, ryan, Ryan, RyanC, Ryan Cleary
- Occupation: Hacker
- Status: Convicted, released on appeal
- Convictions: Aggravated data breach, extortion, privacy violations

Aleksanteri Tomminpoika Kivimäki (formerly Julius Aleksanteri Tomminpoika Kivimäki; born 22 August 1997), known online as zeekill, is a Finnish hacker and cybercriminal. In 2024, he was convicted for one of Finland's largest cybercrimes, the Vastaamo data breach. He first gained attention as a teenager, when he was linked to the hacking collective Lizard Squad and convicted in 2015 on over 50,000 counts for computer intrusions.

Kivimäki hacked into Vastaamo's database in 2018, gaining access to the treatment records of about 33,000 patients. In 2020, he demanded ransom payments from both the company and individual patients, leading to charges of over 21,000 counts of attempted aggravated extortion, nearly 9,600 counts of aggravated invasion of privacy, and 20 counts of aggravated blackmail. He was arrested in February 2023 in France under a false identity and extradited to Finland. In April 2024, the Western Uusimaa District Court sentenced him to six years and three months in prison. He announced plans to appeal.

In September 2025, the Court of Appeal released Kivimäki from prison despite upholding his conviction.

A four-episode Max Original documentary series about Kivimäki, Most Wanted: Teen Hacker, premièred on HBO Max on September 5, 2025.

== Crimes ==
=== Swatting ===
In 2014, he made false emergency calls (swatting) targeting three American families, prompting police units to be dispatched to their homes. In the calls, he claimed there were situations involving hostages, shootings, or explosives. One of the targets was the close relatives of the FBI agent who had investigated Kivimäki.

=== American Airlines flight ===
On 24 August 2014, Kivimäki managed to create a fictitious security threat on an American Airlines flight from Dallas to San Diego. He posed as a passenger on the plane using the real personal information of the passenger in question. The airline and U.S. authorities took the claim seriously: the plane was diverted to Phoenix airport, and the U.S. Air Force dispatched two fighter jets to secure the flight.

=== Lizard Squad ===
During his mid‑teens, Kivimäki, under the online aliases "zeekill" and "ryan", was a member of the hacking group Lizard Squad, which became famous for high‑profile DDoS attacks on gaming services such as PlayStation Network and Xbox Live during Christmas 2014. He participated in media interviews boasting about the group's exploits, but he was not jailed at the time, in part due to his age.

=== Hack the Planet ===
Prior to or concurrent with his Lizard Squad activities, he was also connected with another cybercriminal group known as HTP (Hack the Planet). In 2015, Finnish authorities charged him with operating a botnet attributed to HTP, comprising over 50,000 compromised computers. In July 2015, he pleaded guilty to 50,700 counts of aggravated computer break‑ins and related offences, receiving a suspended two‑year sentence as a minor.

=== Vastaamo data breach ===
In 2018, Kivimäki hacked into the databases of Vastaamo, a major private psychotherapy clinic in Finland, stealing therapy session notes from roughly 33,000 patients. When the company refused his ransom demand (approximately €370,000 in bitcoin) in 2020, he individually extorted patients, demanding €200–500 each to prevent publication of their records.

When authorities identified Kivimäki as the one responsible for the breach, his whereabouts were unknown, and an Interpol Red Notice was issued in October 2022. In February 2023, he was arrested in Paris, France, when police were responding to a domestic disturbance call and found he was using forged identity documents and living under a fake name. Kivimäki had lived a luxurious life in Saint-Tropez, in southern France, and he had a permanent residence in London, England, when he was arrested. He was then extradited to Finland for trial where, in 2024, he was found guilty and sentenced to six years and three months in prison. During the interrogations, Kivimäki said that he had also spent time in Kyiv, Ukraine, the United Arab Emirates, and Barcelona, Spain, prior to his arrest.

In September 2025 Kivimäki was released from custody by the Helsinki court of Appeal. The court cited the long time he spent in pretrial detention as the grounds for his release.
