= Hernán Botbol =

Argentine businessman

Hernán Botbol Herni
- Born: 18 October 1981 (age 44); Buenos Aires, Argentina
- Other names: Herni
- Citizenship: Argentina, USA
- Education: Economics, Business Administration
- Occupation(s): Director of HB Technologies, Co-Founder of Taringa!
- Years active: 2006 – present
- Height: 5 ft 11.5 in (1.816 m)
- Website: www.magic.ly/hernanbotbol

Hernán Botbol (born 18 October 1981) is an Argentine entrepreneur, co-director, and one of the partners of the Web 2.0 platform Taringa!. Taringa! became one of the most visited social networks in Latin America, with significant influence in Argentina, Mexico, and other Spanish-speaking countries.

In 2012, Botbol worked in Silicon Valley to explore the platform’s expansion in the region.

== Biography ==
Born to a family of physicians, Botbol attended Hapnot Collegiate Institute in Manitoba, Canada, and later earned a degree in Business Administration from the Universidad Argentina de la Empresa.

== Foundation of Taringa! ==
Taringa!, inspired by the U.S. website teoti.com, initially operated as a Spanish-language platform where users shared web links, including some pointing to copyrighted content. As traffic grew rapidly, Sanz was unable to manage the increasing legal demands and eventually sold the site to the Botbol brothers and Nakayama in late 2006 for USD 5,000. The site was relaunched in 2007 and underwent multiple changes, most notably the ban on posting links to direct-download sites after a lawsuit by the Cámara Argentina del Libro.

By October 2011, with 70 million monthly unique visitors, Botbol traveled to the United States seeking investors to expand the company and launched Socialphy.com, an English-language version of Taringa! that ultimately failed.

Taringa! became one of the most visited Spanish-language websites prior to the rise of Facebook and Twitter, reaching over 105 million unique users per month across Latin America, Spain, and the United States. According to comScore, it ranked as the fourth most popular social media platform in Latin America.

In 2012, Taringa! was referenced in Spain during debates around the controversial Ley Sinde targeting online piracy.

In May 2015, the Botbol brothers were acquitted in a lawsuit brought by María Kodama, widow of Jorge Luis Borges, over alleged copyright infringement.

== Awards and recognition ==
In 2010, Matías Botbol, Hernán Botbol, and Alberto Nakayama received the Argentine Creative Award from the Círculo de Creativos Argentinos for their work with Taringa!

In 2012, Taringa! won "Website of the Year" in the categories "Best Website" and "Most Popular Website" for Social Communities.

Botbol was also recognized by the Universidad de Palermo in 2012 as one of Argentina’s entrepreneurs of the year.

== Conferences ==
Botbol has been invited to speak at major events in the Spanish-speaking Internet and digital media industry, including Red Innova (Madrid, 2012), Show Me the Money (2012), Pechakucha (2013), Social Media Day Montevideo (2013), IAB Argentina, IAB Uruguay, and the first Digital Culture Forum organized by the Argentine Ministry of Culture.
