= Wanelo =

E-commerce website

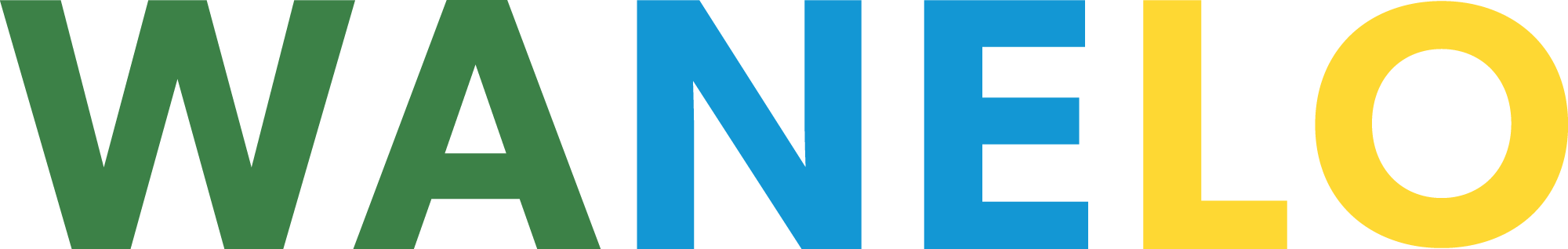
- Company type: Private
- Headquarters: San Francisco
- Founder: Deena Varshavskaya
- CEO: Deena Varshavskaya
- Industry: Internet, e-Commerce, Consumer Goods
- Employees: 33
- Website: http://wanelo.com
- Users: 11 million
- Launched: 2012

Wanelo is an e-commerce company headquartered in San Francisco’s SoMa district. It was founded in 2012 by Deena Varshavskaya.

== History ==
Deena Varshavskaya founded the company because she felt frustrated by shopping in physical malls and wanted a social media platform that would allow her to see what her friends were buying. In 2010, she hired a web developer to help her create the website, which underwent numerous changes into 2011. The website's name "Wanelo" is a combination of the words "want", "need" and "love".

The company raised $2 million in seed-funding round in March 2012 from investors including Floodgate Capital and First Round Capital. In March 2013, Wanelo raised $10 million in funding reportedly raising their valuation to US$100 million. Wanelo 3.0 was launched in 2013.

The company was one of several websites whose user data was hacked and sold by GnosticPlayers in 2019.

== Overview ==
Wanelo is a social platform where users can share and search for items, which they purchase through the retailer's website. The site does not feature any advertisements and is primarily monetized through affiliate marketing. Users can create an account on the site by signing up via email or connecting via Facebook. The site only allows items which are currently available for purchase to be posted.

Wanelo users can post products or follow stores and people. Users can also “Save” items others have posted on Wanelo into their own wish lists. Users can also search for products via hashtags, like many other social networks. The site's layout, which allows users to save and share images of items, has been compared to Pinterest.

Retailers whose products are posted on the website are able to create store pages, which they can organize and manage. Some retailers, including Abercrombie & Fitch added cross-functionality with Wanelo to their own online storefronts.

== Usage ==
As of August 2014, Wanelo had 11 million registered users, up from one million in November 2012. As of 2014, 90% of Wanelo's members were women and 60% were under the age of 24. Along with its website, Wanelo has mobile apps for iOS and Android operating systems. 85% of Wanelo's traffic is from mobile devices.
