= Deena Varshavskaya =

American business woman

- Born: Siberia
- Education: Cornell University (did not graduate)
- Occupation: CEO of Wanelo

Deena Varshavskaya is the founder and CEO of Wanelo (“wah-nee-loh,” from Want, Need, Love) a digital mall where users can discover and buy products from anywhere online. She lives in San Francisco, California.

== Early life ==
Varshavskaya was born and raised in Yakutia, Eastern Siberia, by a stay-at-home mother and a political journalist father. Her parents divorced when she was 16; she, along with her father's family, moved to the United States. She studied psychology, computer science and film studies at Cornell University, but dropped out two courses short of graduating.

== Career ==
After dropping out of Cornell, Varshavskaya moved to New York City and launched her first web startup, ReelACT, a talent video directory for actors. She then moved to Los Angeles and worked for a social network doing product management and user experience design for two years.

After this, Varshavskaya was founder and CEO of experience design agency, Dynamik Interactive, where she worked with large-scale consumer web properties designing digital and social experiences.

Varshavskaya came up with the concept for Wanelo in 2006 after realizing the need for a different online shopping environment that empowers the individual. Varshavskaya wanted to know what her friends were shopping for, but there was not yet an existing platform that made online social shopping easy. In April 2011, Varshavskaya moved to San Francisco to raise funding. After 40 investor rejections, she closed her first round of funding and launched the company in 2012. As of August 2013, Wanelo has 11 million registered users. The company has raised $14 million in funding.

In early 2021, Varshavskaya became an early user of the start-up social media app, Clubhouse. She quickly established herself as an influencer and key contributor in the vibrant cryptocurrency community that has formed on the platform. Considered a Bitcoin maximalist, she prescribes to the idea that "the conditions that led to the launch and bootstrapping of the Bitcoin economy can't or won't repeat" and that "while some may tolerate the wider market for cryptocurrencies, this is only so long as it validates Bitcoin's dominance."

== Recognition ==
Vanity Fair’s November 2013 issue named Varshavskaya one of their fifteen "up-and-comers to keep an eye on". She was featured as one of the 100 Most Intriguing Entrepreneurs in 2013 and 2014 by Goldman Sachs. TechCrunch gave Varshavskaya the Best Ecommerce Application award for the Wanelo Shopping app at the Crunchies Awards 2013. In 2014 she was named one of Fast Company’s Most Creative People in Business, included in Details Magazine’s list of Digital Mavericks, named an “Influencer” on the National Retail Federation's “List of People Shaping Retail’s Future," and recognized by Glamour Magazine as one of "35 Women Under 35 Who Are Changing the Tech Industry". In 2015, she was named to AskMen's list of the “Top 99 Most Outstanding Women” and included on the San Francisco Business Journal's “40 under 40” list.
