= Lizard Squad =

Hacker group

- Lizard Squad logo
- Formation: August 18, 2014
- Type: Hacking
- Members: 7

Lizard Squad was a black hat hacking group, mainly known for claiming responsibility for a series of distributed denial-of-service (DDoS) attacks that disrupted video-gaming-related services.

On September 3, 2014, Lizard Squad seemingly announced that it had disbanded only to return later on, claiming responsibility for a variety of attacks on prominent websites. The organization at one point participated in the Darkode hacking forums and shared hosting with them.

On April 30, 2016, Cloudflare published a blog post detailing how cyber criminals using this group's name were issuing random threats of carrying out DDoS attacks. Despite these threats, Cloudflare claim they failed to carry through with a single attack. As a result of this, the British National Fraud Intelligence Bureau issued an alert warning businesses not to comply with ransom messages threatening DDoS attacks.

== Notable actions ==
Lizard Squad has claimed responsibility for launching a string of DDoS attacks against high-profile game-related services over the course of a few months in late 2014. On August 18, 2014, servers of the game League of Legends were taken offline with a DDoS attack; this was claimed as Lizard Squad's first attack. Days later, on August 24, the PlayStation Network was disrupted via a DDoS attack. On November 23, the group claimed they attacked Destiny servers with a DDoS attack. On December 1, Xbox Live was apparently attacked by Lizard Squad: users attempting to connect to use the service would be given the 80151909 error code. On December 2, Lizard Squad defaced Machinima.com, replacing their front page with ASCII art of their logo. A week after, on December 8, Lizard Squad claimed responsibility for another PlayStation Network DDoS attack. On December 22, though not game-related, Internet in North Korea was taken offline by a DDoS attack. Lizard Squad claimed responsibility for the attack and linked to an IP address located in North Korea. North Korean Internet services were restored on 23 December 2014.

=== Christmas Xbox and PlayStation attacks ===
Lizard Squad had previously threatened to take down gaming services on Christmas.

On December 25, 2014 (Christmas Day), Lizard Squad launched a massive DDoS attack against PlayStation Network and Xbox Live, disrupting gaming services for millions of users worldwide. PlayStation Network, which had approximately 110 million subscribers at the time, and Xbox Live, with roughly 48 million subscribers, were rendered inaccessible during peak holiday gaming hours. Xbox Live was restored within 24 hours, but PlayStation Network struggled with extended outages that prevented both existing subscribers and new console owners from accessing online features or downloading games. Gizmodo reported that the attacks may have ceased after Kim Dotcom offered Lizard Squad 3000 accounts on his upload service MEGA.

The attack gained widespread media attention when Lizard Squad members gave interviews to various news outlets, including BBC Radio 5 Live and Sky News. Julius Kivimäki, using the alias "Ryan," appeared on Sky News and showed no remorse for the impact on users, claiming the attack was meant to embarrass major technology corporations and force people to spend time with their families instead of gaming.

=== Tor Sybil attack ===
On December 26, 2014, a Sybil attack involving more than 3,000 relays was attempted against the Tor network. Nodes with names beginning with "LizardNSA" began appearing, Lizard Squad claimed responsibility for this attack.

The relevance of the attack was questioned. According to Tor relay node operator Thomas White, the consensus system made that Lizard Squad only managed to control "0.2743% of the network, equivalent to a tiny VPS".

=== Malaysia Airlines website attack ===
On January 26, 2015, the website of Malaysia Airlines was attacked, apparently by Lizard Squad, calling itself a "cyber caliphate". Users were redirected to another page bearing an image of a tuxedo-wearing lizard, and reading "Hacked by Cyber Caliphate". Underneath this was text reading "follow the cyber caliphate on twitter" after which were the Twitter accounts of the owner of UMG, "@UMGRobert" and CEO of UMG, "@UMG_Chris". The page also carried the headline "404 - Plane Not Found", an apparent reference to the airline's loss of flight MH370 the previous year. Malaysia Airlines assured customers and clients that customer data had not been compromised.

Media reports around the world said versions of the takeover in some regions included the wording "ISIS will prevail", which listed concerns of Lizard Squad's association with the Islamic State.

=== Daybreak Games DDoS ===
On July 9, 2015, game servers operated by Daybreak Game Company, including those of H1Z1 and PlanetSide 2, were disrupted by a DDoS attack that Lizard Squad claimed responsibility for. The attack was performed in retaliation to legal threats John Smedley, the company's CEO, had made after being targeted by the hacking group.

== False claims ==
=== Bomb threats ===
On August 24, 2014, Lizard Squad claimed that a plane on which the president of Sony Online Entertainment, John Smedley, was flying (American Airlines Flight 362), had explosives on board. The flight from Dallas to San Diego made an unscheduled landing in Phoenix, Arizona. Sony Online Entertainment announced that the FBI was investigating the incident.

=== Facebook, Instagram, and Tinder attack ===
On January 26, 2015, several social media services including Facebook and Instagram were unavailable to users. Tinder and HipChat were also affected. Lizard Squad claimed responsibility for the attacks, via a posting on a Twitter account previously used by the group. The outage, originally speculated to be a distributed denial-of-service attack, lasted a little under an hour before services were restored.

Facebook later released a statement saying its own engineers were to blame, and that the disruption to its services was not the result of a third-party attack, but instead occurred after they introduced a change that affected their configuration systems.

=== Explicit celebrity photos ===
On January 27, 2015, Lizard Squad claimed to have compromised Taylor Swift's Twitter and Instagram accounts. Once they claimed to have access, they threatened to release nude photos in exchange for bitcoins. Taylor Swift, however, retorted that "there were no naked pics" and told the offenders to "have fun" finding any.

=== Conspiracy theory ===
On January 4, 2021, American lawyer and conspiracy theorist L. Lin Wood tweeted out baseless claims that a group of hackers named "the lizard squad" have evidence of a global sex ring involving several high-profile Americans, similar to the discredited conspiracy theory QAnon. There seems to be no relation between the "lizard squad" mentioned by Wood and the black-hat hacking group Lizard Squad, and Vinnie Omari, a member of the Lizard Squad, denies any claim that his group may have information on a global sex-trafficking organization.

== Known members ==
=== Vinnie Omari ===
Vinnie Omari is a member of the Lizard Squad who was arrested and bailed under the alleged offences of "Enter into/concerned in acquisition/retention/use or control criminal property, Fraud by false representation - Fraud Act 2006, Conspire to steal from another, unauthorized computer access with intent to commit other offences". He was used as a public face on television and as a spokesperson for the news to represent LizardSquad.

On New Year's Eve 2014, Vinnie Omari was raided by UK authorities in connection to the Christmas Xbox and PlayStation attacks, but was later cleared of any involvement.

=== Julius Kivimäki ===
Julius Kivimäki (zeekill) is a Finnish member of Lizard Squad convicted in July 2015 on over 50,000 counts of computer crime. In 2022, he was also suspected of the Vastaamo data breach, after having hacked around 50,000 psychotherapy patients' medical records and demanded ransoms for not publishing them.

=== Zachary Buchta ===
19-year-old Zachary Buchta from Maryland, has been charged with computer crimes associated with a series of distributed denial-of-service (DDoS) attacks, stolen credit cards and selling DDoS-for-hire services. He was one of the members behind LizardSquad and also the Co-Group "PoodleCorp" which launched distributed denial-of-service (DDoS) attacks against multiple networks, YouTubers and gaming services. Buchta was hiding behind the Twitter alias @fbiarelosers, @xotehpoodle, and the online aliases "pein" and "lizard".

He was arrested in 2016 for his involvement with both Lizard Squad and another hacking group called PoodleCorp. Despite being warned by police in 2014 about his minor cybercrime activities, Buchta continued his illegal activities and even taunted law enforcement by changing his Twitter profile to @fbiarelosers.

=== Bradley Jan Willem van Rooy ===
19-year-old Bradley Jan Willem van Rooy (UchihaLS) from the Netherlands, has been charged with computer crimes associated with a series of distributed denial-of-service (DDoS) attacks, stolen credit cards and selling DDoS-for-hire services. He was one of the members behind LizardSquad who was mainly responsible for launching the DDoS-attacks announced by the group. He was also one of the two managers behind the Twitter account @LizardLands which is the main Twitter account of LizardSquad since January 2015. He was normally hiding behind his Twitter alias @UchihaLS (which stands for Uchiha LizardSquad) and the online aliases "UchihaLS", "Uchiha" and "Dragon".

=== Jordan Lee-Bevan ===
18-year-old Jordan Lee-Bevan from Southport, Merseyside, was arrested on January 16, 2015, in connection with the Lizard Squad Christmas 2014 attacks on PlayStation Network and Xbox Live. Police raided his semi-detached home and seized computers before taking him away in a police car.
