= Office of the Registrar General, Birth & Death Registration =

Bangladesh government regulatory agency

- রেজিস্ট্রার জেনারেলের কার্যালয়, জন্ম ও মৃত্যু নিবন্ধন
- Seal of Office of the Registrar General, Birth & Death Registration
- Formation: 2013
- Headquarters: Paribahan Pool Building, 9th floor, Bangladesh Secretariat, Dhaka, Bangladesh
- Official language: Bengali
- Adviser: Asif Mahmud
- Secretary: Md. Rezaul Maqsud Zahedi
- Website: orgbdr.gov.bd

The Office of the Registrar General, Birth & Death Registration (Bengali: রেজিস্ট্রার জেনারেলের কার্যালয়, জন্ম ও মৃত্যু নিবন্ধন) is a Bangladesh government regulatory agency under the Ministry of Local Government, Rural Development and Co-operatives responsible for the registration of births and deaths in Bangladesh. The website of this agency had a massive data breach in June and July of 2023, exposing citizens personal data that included names, phone numbers, national identity card information, and addresses.

== History ==
In 2001, the government of Bangladesh started Birth and Death Registration Project with support from UNICEF. The project was placed under the Local Government Division. The Birth and Death Registration Act 1873 and Births, Deaths and Marriages Registration Act 1886 were repealed. A new Birth and Death Registration Act was passed in 2004. The law allowed local government bodies and Bangladesh embassies abroad to register births and deaths. The Office of the Registrar General of Birth and Death was established in September 2013 to establish a permanent central database of birth and death records.

According to an estimate of the Office of the Registrar General, Birth & Death Registration 10 million children under the age of five do not have birth certificates and registrations.

Office of the Registrar General, Birth & Death Registration is having difficulties with online registration of birth certificates as of January 2021. The database has problems with recording the wrong gender on certificates and records according to a report by Dhaka Tribune.

== Services ==
Birth Registration

- Application for birth registration
- Application status
- Verify birth registration
- Cancel more than one birth registration
- Birth and death registration complaint by online
- Birth certificate verification
- Real time data of birth
- Login
- E-Report

Death Registration

- Application of Death Registration
- Death application status
- Verify Death Registration

== See also ==
- 2023 Bangladesh Government website data breach
