= NOW:Pensions =

British private pensions scheme

NOW: Pensions
- Company type: Privately held company
- Industry: Financial services
- Founded: 2011
- Services: Defined contribution (DC) pension plans
- Website: www.nowpensions.com

NOW: Pensions is a private UK-based financial institution specialized in pensions.

== History ==
The Pensions Act 2008 established new duties which require employers to automatically enrol eligible workers into a workplace pension plan that meets certain minimum standards. NOW: Pensions was set up by ATP of Denmark for employers requiring a scheme to fulfil their duties under the Act. ATP launched Now:Pensions in early 2012, Morten Nilsson was headed the group as CEO. During the three years leading up to June 30, 2017 Now:Pensions achieved a 2.8 percent annualized return, which was significantly less than the returns achieved by almost all of its competitors during the same time.

In November 2017 the Pensions Regulator fined the trustees of Now:Pensions £50,000 for administration problems. This was followed by a fine for £20,000 levied in February 2018. In February 2019, The Cardano Group acquired Now:Pensions from ATP, after Now:Pensions ran into multiple administration problems and years of poor performance.

In 2025, Now:Pensions made its first investment in private markets with an allocation to UK affordable housing.

== See also ==
- Pensions in the United Kingdom
- The Pensions Regulator
- National Employment Savings Trust
- The People's Pension
