= Vinny Troia =

American cybersecurity researcher

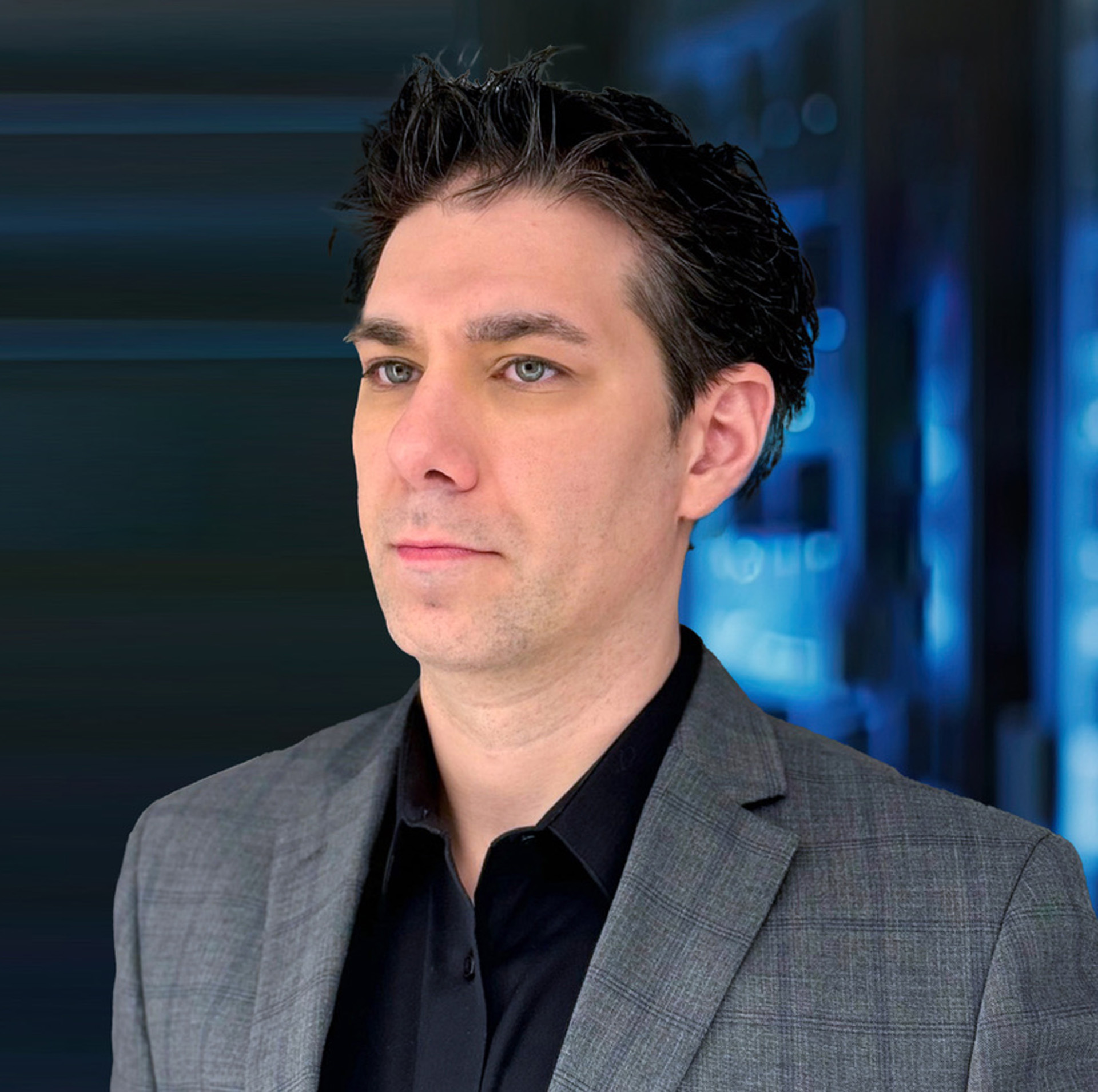
- Education: PhD, Capella University (2018); M.S., Information Assurance and Security, Western Governors University
- Occupation: Researcher
- Years active: 2003–present
- Organizations: Night Lion Security; Shadow Nexus
- Known for: Cybersecurity
- Website: vinnytroia.com

Vincenzo "Vinny" Troia is an American cybersecurity researcher and author specializing in open-source intelligence (OSINT), data breaches, and dark web investigations. He is the author of Grey Area: Dark Web Data Collection and the Future of OSINT and Hunting Cyber Criminals. Troia has published research on cybercriminal groups including The Dark Overlord, ShinyHunters, and Scattered Spider.

== Career ==
Troia serves as owner and CEO of Shadow Nexus and Night Lion Security, cybersecurity firms based in the US.

In 2018, Troia found a data leak of nearly 340 million detailed records about individual people available on a publicly accessible server of Exactis.

In 2019, he found a data breach at People Data Labs in which records of personal data, including email addresses, employers, locations, job titles, names, phone numbers and social media profiles of 1.2 billion people, were exposed.

In July 2020, Data Viper, a threat intelligence platform operated by Troia, was reportedly compromised. The site, which claimed to host over 8,200 datasets linked to various data breaches, was described by Troia as a deliberate honeypot designed to track and identify individuals in connection with investigations referenced in his book and published works.

In August 2020, Troia wrote a report on the process by which hackers make money by stealing and reselling Fortnite video game cosmetics, some making nearly a million dollars per year.

In November 2021, hacker Pompompurin, admin of the Dark Web data sharing forum BreachForums, publicly harassed Troia by hacking into the FBI email servers and sending hundreds of thousands of emails accusing him of being part of The Dark Overlord hacking group. Troia said that the same hacker had previously performed a DDoS attack on one of his websites and hacked the National Center for Missing & Exploited Children's blog to create a fake blog post about him.

== Notable investigations ==
Troia acted as an intermediary between Alexander "Connor" Moucka (aka "Catist" and "Judische") and companies targeted in the Snowflake data breach. Troia has written that he is the person referred to as "Individual-1" in Moucka's U.S. indictment. In Grey Area, he wrote that he was "Reddington", the security researcher whom Wired described as the go-between in the hacker's negotiation with AT&T, which paid $370,000 to have stolen call records deleted.

Troia also conducted investigative research into the hacking groups The Dark Overlord and ShinyHunters. His research was detailed in his 2020 book Hunting Cyber Criminals, which examined the groups' operations, methods, and impact. In addition to the book, Troia published a detailed investigative report analyzing the groups' activities and affiliations.

== Publications ==
In 2025, Troia authored Grey Area: Dark Web Data Collection and the Future of OSINT (Wiley), which covers the use of hacked, breached and leaked data for intelligence and national security purposes and includes interviews and commentary from officials at the CIA, ODNI, DIA and Department of Defense. The book includes Troia's first-person account of the 2024 Snowflake data breach, which affected more than 160 companies, including his interactions with the hackers while using the pseudonym Reddington, and the extortion negotiations with affected organizations.

In 2020, Troia authored the book Hunting Cyber Criminals: A Hacker's Guide to Online Intelligence Gathering Tools and Techniques (Wiley), which illustrates various investigative tools and techniques used to track down and investigate cybercriminals using open source intelligence (OSINT). The book provides a detailed account of Troia's investigation into the hacking group The Dark Overlord.

In the book and in a 2020 report, Troia argued that The Dark Overlord was run by two teenagers from Calgary, Canada, and linked its members to other data breach groups, including ShinyHunters and GnosticPlayers.

== Early career (music) ==
In 2003, Troia founded Curvve Recordings, an electronic dance music record label. Curvve's remixes of Ultra Naté's "Free", by Oscar G, Trendroid, J. Sanchez, Corbett and Troia, reached No. 23 on the Billboard Dance Club Songs chart in 2004. In September 2005, Curvve's remix release of Jody Watley's "Looking for a New Love" reached No. 1 on the same chart.

Troia's single "Flow" (2006), credited to Vinny Troia presents Jaidene Veda, reached No. 24 on the Dance Club Songs chart. Its remixes included versions by Gareth Emery and Starkillers. Curvve released N'Dea Davenport's "One Day My Love", which reached No. 10 in January 2007. Troia's 2010 single "Do For Love", featuring Jaidene Veda, with remixes by Dave Audé and D:Fuse, reached No. 31.

Curvve also released music by Christopher Lawrence and a David Guetta remix of Chris Willis's "My Freedom".
