= Storenvy =

E-commerce platform

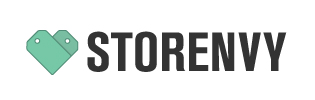
- Company type: Privately held
- Founded: 2010
- Headquarters: Chico, California, United States
- Owners: MoreCommerce, Inc.
- Founder: Jonathan Crawford
- Industry: e-Commerce
- Website: www.storenvy.com
- Written in: Ruby on Rails

Storenvy is an e-commerce platform. It is an online store builder, combined with a social marketplace. Storenvy launched in 2012. At present, there are 90,000 merchants available that list a variety of products at Storenvy.

== Services ==
=== Custom stores ===
Storenvy first launched as an online store builder in 2010. The platform allows store owners, makers, and artists to open an online store for free and customize it.

=== Storenvy marketplace ===
When merchants open a store on Storenvy, their products are also featured on the Storenvy marketplace, combining the aspects of a store builder and a marketplace.

== Pricing ==
Storenvy generates revenue through both subscription revenue and on commission fees from sales. This revenue directly funnels the marketing services the company provides to drive additional traffic to store owners.

== History ==
Storenvy was launched in 2010. It was purchased in 2016 by The Opensky Project , and was later sold with other business assets to MoreCommerce Inc., an Alibaba Group subsidiary.
