= WellNow Urgent Care =

American urgent care clinic network

- Company type: Privately Held
- Founded: 2012; 14 years ago
- Founder: John Radford
- Headquarters: Chicago, Illinois
- Number of locations: 213
- Website: wellnow.com

Five Star Urgent Care logo

WellNow Urgent Care, formerly Five Star Urgent Care, is an American conglomerate of walk-in urgent care clinics that serve as alternatives to emergency rooms across Illinois, Indiana, Michigan, New York and Pennsylvania.

== Background ==
The organisation is the largest urgent care provider in Central New York. Services provided by WellNow Urgent Care include treatment for non-life-threatening illnesses and injuries.

Unlike most urgent care and medical practices, WellNow employs very few physicians or registered nurses, opting for their practices to be mid-level-driven- by physician assistants, medical assistants, and LPNs being utilized as clinical staff instead.

== History ==
WellNow Urgent Care was founded in Big Flats, New York in 2012 as "Five Star Urgent Care" by John Radford, a former emergency room physician. In 2014, WellNow Urgent Care expanded to six locations. That same year, the company began offering patients the ability to view wait times for its facilities on its website.

In 2016, the company opened another location in Liverpool, New York. The Liverpool location differs from the other locations because it offers specialized pediatric urgent care in addition to the normal urgent care services. In 2017, WellNow Urgent Care opened one more location in Vestal, New York. In 2018, the company rebranded as WellNow Urgent Care.

In 2022, WellNow acquired 55 Physicians Immediate Care centers and relocated its headquarters to Chicago, Illinois, as a result of further expansion.
