= Dutch police data breach =

2024 data Breach in the Netherlands

The National Police Corps of the Netherlands suffered a data breach in 2024.

== Discovery ==
The data breach was discovered on 26 September 2024.

== Impact ==
The names, email addresses and phone numbers of nearly 63,000 officers were exposed. In some cases, other information was exposed.

The leak did not just affect police officers, but also janitors and front-desk employees.

== Reactions ==
The incident was disclosed to the Dutch Parliament by Minister for Justice and Security David van Weel.

Dutch Police chief Janny Knol said "I am – like many of you – shocked that this could have happened, and it affects me that our colleagues' data turned out not to be safe". She said in a separate statement that "In order to provide safety outside, you have to feel safe inside".

In October 2024 the Dutch government announced that it suspected hackers working for a foreign government to be behind the data breach. In May 2025 the Dutch intelligence services AIVD and MIVD attributed the breach to a previously unknown hacking group, which they named Laundry Bear and described as very likely Russian state-sponsored. The group had gained access to a police employee's account through a session hijacking attack, using a browser cookie that may have been captured by infostealer malware and bought on a criminal forum.
