= Roadtrippers =

Web based software application

- Type: Private company
- Industry: Consumer Web
- Founded: Cincinnati, Ohio, United States (July 2011)
- Headquarters: Cincinnati, Ohio, United States
- Area served: United States; Canada
- Key people: Tatiana Parent; James Fisher, CEO; Ken Valuska, CFO; John Lauck; Andrew Fickas; Joshua Smibert; Tim Balzer; Brandon Hite
- Products: iPhone app, Android app, web app
- Number of employees: 44
- Website: roadtrippers.com

Roadtrippers is a web based software application, mobile app, and content provider that helps travelers plan road trips. The software lets users discover independently owned points of interest in the United States and Canada. Once a trip is saved, it can be synced to the Roadtrippers iPhone app, for turn-by-turn navigation, and further local discovery while on the road.

Since 2011, the team at Roadtrippers have worked on securing investments and growing the business. The company was founded by James Fisher and Tatiana Parent. The headquarters are in Cincinnati, Ohio.

== History ==
=== Origins (2011-2012) ===
Roadtrippers co-founder James Fisher grew up traveling. His family ran a safari company in Africa. His fellow co-founder, Tatiana Parent, shares his passion for travel, having traveled the USA extensively herself.

Fisher and Parent brainstormed the idea of Roadtrippers in 2010. They were frustrated with the lack of useful travel resources. Particularly for finding independent places to visit, and syncing travel advice with navigation. This frustration led them to create Roadtrippers.

Fisher and Parent moved from Great Britain in 2011 to focus on their company. In July 2011, The Brandery, a Cincinnati-based startup accelerator, accepted Roadtrippers into its program. The Brandery's aim is to helps new businesses with securing funding, gaining mentors, and networking with business professionals.

In June 2012, the company launched a public beta version of its application. The application allowed use of the unpolished software in order to gain feedback for the website's full release.

=== Expansion ===
Roadtrippers official website launched in July 2012. Roadtrippers has since grown to a team of 25 full-time employees including John Lauck, appointed VP of Engineering in 2012. The company has a team of developers and designers as well as a network of travel content creators. The Roadtrippers team expanded the company outside of the United States to Canada, the United Kingdom, and Israel.

In November 2012, after working with app developer Forest Giant, Roadtrippers released a companion iPhone app. The app was launched on Gizmodo app of the day on Nov 19th, 2012. In December 2012, Roadtrippers reached 1 million monthly users. In November 2014, Roadtrippers released version 3.0 of its iOS app. The new version does not require the user to create an account to use the app. It does include weather forecasting and icons for users to select what they are interested in (e.g., diners, hiking, discover locations nearby.

Roadtrippers was recognized on TIME's 50 Best Websites of 2014.

In 2018, Roadtrippers was acquired by Thor Industries/Tourist Holdings Inc. In February 2019, Roadtrippers Plus was added as a paid feature service. Initial discounted offering was $10 for a year subscription to existing Roadtrippers App users for limited time. Free version was downgraded from 60 waypoints per trip down to 6 and subsequently down to 2, severely limiting the usefulness of the free version. Shortly after the initial offering, the price for a year subscription jumped to the current rate of $30/year.

== Funding ==
Through 2012, the company secured $500,000 in venture funding from CincyTech, Vine St. Ventures, Ludlow Ventures and a number of angel investors. In August 2013, the company received a $2.5 million investment from Drive Capital for expansion.

== Features ==
The Roadtrippers application lets travelers plan trips, calculate time and gas expense, and choose from over 5 million independent locations in the United States to visit. The application used to heavily rely on Google Maps API, but has since moved to MapBox. Users can plan their routes and select interests from categories and sub-categories within 10–30 miles of the main route. The areas of interest are then displayed on the map, and the mileage and gas costs are recalculated. The application road trip planner calculates approximate trip mileage, travel time, and fuel cost. Trip itineraries built on the Roadtrippers web platform sync with the iPhone app and Android app.

The Roadtrippers proprietary search accesses a database of over 5 million points of interest. Users can also discover locations by selecting categories of interest. Categories include accommodations, food and drink, history, nature, culture, shopping, sports and more. Users can also rate, review, and read what other users have to say about points of interest. Users with a free Roadtrippers account have the option to "save" locations that they are interested to a public profile.

Roadtrippers "guides" are curated lists of locations (e.g., "Diners to Die For," "Wine Country," "Geektown" and "Mad Science").

The Roadtrippers team began building features to enable hotel booking via the application in September 2012 In September 2015, Roadtrippers incorporated hotel meta search to display prices from multiple hotel booking providers on specific accommodations.

In May 2015 Roadtrippers launched a watch app. The application is backed by Roadtrippers database of over 5 million points of interest. It ranks locations by user rating and displays the highest rated points of interest "nearby".

== Adoption ==
According to Alexa, Roadtrippers is ranked at 28,884 in the USA. As of January 2013, the service has 160,000 users, making it one of the fastest growing US travel sites launched in 2012.

== Challenges ==
While Roadtrippers offers over 50,000 attractions in the United States, reviews written in 2012 said it still had a ways to go, and needed more attractions in order to garner new and repeat users.
