= DailyBooth =

Photoblogging website

- Website type: Image hosting service, social networking, photoblog
- Founded: 13 February 2009
- Dissolved: 31 December 2012
- Creators: Jon Wheatley and Ryan Amos
- Website: www.dailybooth.com
- Commercial: No
- Registration: Yes

DailyBooth was a photoblogging website designed for users to take a photo of themselves every day with a caption, in order to document and share their life with others, thus the slogan "your life in pictures." It was similar to social-networking websites such as Twitter in that you could follow other users and allow them to follow you in turn and get real-time updates on what other people are doing. The user base was geared towards teens.

In August 2009, the site was reported to have over 3 million unique visitors a month with a growth rate of about 35% a month. On 11 November 2012, it was announced that the site would be closing down on 14 November, with users able to access and download their content until 31 December, at which point the site would be deleted completely.

DailyBooth was funded by the startup funding firm, Y Combinator.

== History ==
DailyBooth was founded and opened in February 2009 by Jon Wheatley and lead developer Ryan Amos, gaining popularity after several YouTube stars and Internet celebrities, such as Ashton Kutcher and his wife Demi Moore joined and encouraged their viewers and readers to join. On 7 September 2009 the site passed the 1,000,000 photo mark and the user who posted the 1,000,000th photo won a Throwboy pillow. In early 2010, the website reached 3,000,000 photos and 10,000,000 comments.

There were three versions of DailyBooth, the original (1.0), and two complete re-writes (2.0 and 3.0).

Y Combinator stated that they had once considered a name change for DailyBooth, but were afraid it would cause a revolt with the community. In April 2012 it was announced that Airbnb will take over the team of DailyBooth in their search for talent.

On 11 November 2012, members were sent an e-mail stating that no more content could be uploaded after 14 November and that all content will be permanently deleted on 31 December 2012. They introduced an option to export all the photos on an account. On 15 November 2012, DailyBooth became read only, removing the ability for users to post any new photos or comments. It closed completely on 31 December 2012.

== Features ==
A typical DailyBooth user's photo with text and image comments

The Live Feed was a feature which displays a real-time stream of recent photos and activity from all public members on the site.

The Live Map displayed real-time updates on a map.

DailyBooth allowed users to automatically post a link to their Twitter account when they take new photos. DailyBooth also offered short URLs for users to link to their photos.

== Dailybooth Mobile Apps ==
Dailybooth released an iPhone Application that was very popular. With the release of Dailybooth V.3 came the launch of the all new Dailybooth application which included live feed, and the ability to message other users. The application is no longer available in Apple App Store.
