= MyFitnessPal =

Smartphone application and website

- Original authors: Albert Lee; Mike Lee
- Developers: MyFitnessPal, Inc.
- Release: 2005
- Operating system: Android, iOS, watchOS, Wear OS
- Type: Health informatics, physical fitness
- License: Freemium
- Website: www.myfitnesspal.com

MyFitnessPal is a health and fitness tracking smartphone app and website. The app is available for Android and iOS devices.

== Overview ==
The app allows users to identify the nutritional value of particular food or drink items, track their dietary intake and calorie and macronutrient goals, create personalized meal plans, and track exercise activity. According to the company, specific tools and content are available for users taking GLP-1 medications.

According to the company, as of 2026 the app has 280 million users and is available in over 120 countries.

== History ==
MyFitnessPal was initially developed in 2004 by Mike Lee, a Silicon Valley marketing executive, as a web-based calorie tracking tool. It officially launched in September 2005. His brother, Albert Lee, joined as co-founder in 2008, and helped to grow the venture. The company was entirely self-funded during this time, with advertising as the only source of revenue.

Leveraging the success of the iPhone 3G, MyFitnessPal released an iOS app in 2009. MyFitnessPal was one of the first weight loss and fitness-related mobile apps, and it quickly gained users as smartphone adoption soared. By 2013, the app had 40 million subscribers. That same year, MyFitnessPal raised $18 million in its first institutional funding round, led by Kleiner Perkins with participation from Accel Partners. John Doerr of Kleiner Perkins and Andrew Braccia of Accel joined the company's board.

On February 4, 2015, MyFitnessPal was acquired by athletic apparel maker, Under Armour, in a deal worth $475 million. MyFitnessPal had 80 million users at the time. Later that year, the app introduced a premium subscription tier. In January 2017, founders Albert Lee and Mike Lee departed from the company to pursue other business ventures. On October 30, 2020, Under Armour announced that MyFitnessPal would be sold to the private equity firm Francisco Partners for $345 million.

In early 2024, Mike Fisher was appointed as MyFitnessPal CEO, succeeding Dinesh Lathi. In April 2024, MyFitnessPal introduced support tools designed for users on GLP-1 medications. That same year, MyFitnessPal acquired Intent, a personalized meal-planning app. Intent's software features were then integrated into the MyFitnessPal app. In March 2026, MyFitnessPal acquired Cal AI, an AI calorie counting app with more than $30 million in annual revenue. The acquisition included Cal AI's food recognition technology and nutrition database.

== Security breach ==
On March 29, 2018, Under Armour disclosed a data breach of 150 million accounts at its subsidiary, MyFitnessPal. The compromised data consisted of usernames, e-mail addresses, and hashed passwords, but not credit card numbers or government identifiers (social security numbers, national identification numbers). Under Armour was notified of the breach ten to four days before the disclosure and learned that the leak happened sometime in February.

== See also ==
- Google Fit
- Health (Apple), also known as Apple Health
- MSN Health & Fitness
