= Taringa! =

Argentine social network

- Website type: Social network
- Owner: IOV Labs (2019–2024)
- Creator: Fernando Sanz (Cypher)
- Commercial: Yes
- Registration: Free
- Launched: 2004; 22 years ago
- Current status: Defunct since 25 March 2024

Taringa! (stylized in all-caps as TARINGA!) was an Argentine-based social networking site geared toward Hispanophone users.

Taringa! had a 27 million registered user base, according to its own metrics, who created and shared thousands of daily posts on general interest topics such as life hacks, tutorials, recipes, reviews, and art.

The platform had a presence in every country in the Spanish-speaking world – its main markets were Argentina, Spain, Colombia, and Chile. According to comScore statistics in 2013, it was the fourth most popular Latin American social network and the second in traffic after Facebook. From 2015 onward, the site's traffic gradually declined.

== History ==
=== Origins and early growth (2004–2006) ===
Taringa! was created on June 8, 2004, by Fernando Sanz (known as Cypher), a secondary school student from Buenos Aires. The site's design was based on teoti.com, functioning as a hybrid between a forum and a blog where users could share articles, links, and downloadable content. It initially gained popularity through university mailing lists in Argentina, as it facilitated access to study materials. The site's motto was "Inteligencia Colectiva" (Collective Intelligence).

As the site grew to 30,000 daily visits, the costs of hosting and development became unsustainable for Sanz. In November 2006, he sold 90% of the site for US$5,000 to Alberto Nakayama and the Botbol brothers, Matías and Hernán, who were running Wiroos, the company that hosted Taringa!.

=== Expansion and peak traffic (2007–2014) ===
Under the new ownership, the site's traffic increased after being indexed by Google. A community developed around original content creation, including tutorials and documentaries, along with a distinctive culture and slang in the comments section.

Beginning in 2009, following the approval of anti-piracy legislation such as the SOPA and Ley Sinde laws, Taringa! removed piracy-related links and began transitioning toward use as a social community. In that year, version 4 of the site introduced communities (user-created groups organized by topic), and in 2011 "Shouts" were added — short-form messages similar to Twitter posts. By October 2011, the site reported 70 million unique monthly visits.

In July 2014, Taringa! redesigned its home page with a new algorithm to highlight content and introduced geolocation technology to personalize the front page by country. At its peak, the platform reached 75 million unique monthly users and an estimated valuation of US$20 million.

=== Monetization and bitcoin integration (2015–2018) ===
In April 2015, Taringa! launched the "Taringa! Creadores" program in partnership with Xapo, the bitcoin wallet created by Argentine entrepreneur Wenceslao Casares. The program implemented an advertising revenue-sharing scheme: registered users received compensation in bitcoins based on the views, user ratings, and advertising revenue generated by their posts. The first stage had an initial investment of US$750,000. A subsequent program, Taringa! Bits, allowed all users to exchange bitcoin tips: each creator received 10 daily points to distribute among other users, which were then issued in the cryptocurrency.

In 2017, version 7 of the site was released, a complete rewrite of the codebase that introduced a public API, thematic channels replacing communities, user blocking, and content personalization.

In September 2017, Taringa! suffered a database breach when almost 28 million database entries were leaked.

=== IOV Labs acquisition and closure (2019–2024) ===
In September 2019, Taringa! was acquired by IOV Labs, an Argentine blockchain company and creator of the RSK smart contract platform. IOV Labs sought to use the community's 30 million users to drive mass adoption of its decentralized protocols.

In May 2023, a mobile application was launched in beta. The website announced on March 11, 2024, that it would shut down from March 24, due to changing trends in social media platforms and the difficulty of monetizing in such an environment. It closed definitively on March 25, 2024.

== Features ==
=== Posts ===
Posts were the main content type on Taringa!. Users could create long-form articles with text, images, and embedded videos, organized across thirty thematic categories. Other users could rate posts using a points system, comment on them, save them as favorites, or share them via Shouts or other social networks.

=== Shouts ===
Introduced in May 2011, Shouts were short-form messages of up to 255 characters, similar to Twitter posts. Users could share thoughts, photos, videos, or links, which were received by their followers in real time. Shouts could be commented on, recommended, and voted on.

=== Communities ===
Launched in September 2009, Communities were user-created groups organized around specific topics. The platform had over 80,000 communities covering subjects such as technology, drawing, music, anime, and cosplay.

=== Points and ranking system ===
Users had a daily allocation of points they could distribute among posts they considered valuable, with a maximum of 10 points per post. The accumulated points received on a user's posts determined their rank, which in turn granted additional privileges such as higher daily point allocations and posting frequency. Ranks in version 4 ranged from "Novato" (Novice) to "Gold", with the top 100 users in the site's ranking receiving Silver or Gold status.

== Copyright disputes ==
=== Legal proceedings ===
Taringa!'s protocol required users to post only original content or material that did not infringe copyright laws. When links that infringed copyright were identified, they were to be removed by the site's administrators and moderators.

The owners maintained that the website functioned as an intermediary and did not host files directly, but acknowledged that users sometimes posted links that violated copyright.

In May 2011, the Botbol brothers were prosecuted for infringing article 72 of Law 11.723, which regulates copyright in Argentina, and ordered to pay $200,000 (US$20,000). In October 2011, Alberto Nakayama was also prosecuted for the same charges. In January 2012, Taringa! was included in an FBI investigation for copyright infringement as part of the prosecution against Megaupload.

The case was elevated to oral trial in September 2012, the first time the responsibility of a website for user-generated content would be discussed through oral proceedings in Argentina.

=== Resolution and acquittal ===
In December 2012, the website announced an upgraded system to report content susceptible to copyright infringement, based on a "notice and takedown" method modeled after the Digital Millennium Copyright Act (DMCA).

In 2013, the main plaintiffs decided to desist from continuing the lawsuit. In April that same year, Taringa! signed an agreement with leading intellectual property organizations to work jointly on the circulation of cultural content online.

On December 17, 2018, after nine years of proceedings, the Oral Criminal Court No. 26 of Buenos Aires, presided by Judge Adrián Norberto Martín, acquitted all three defendants: Matías Botbol, Hernán Botbol, and Alberto Nakayama. The court ruled that it was impossible for the site administrators to verify all user-generated content in advance, and that requiring them to do so would constitute a form of prior restraint. The prosecutor in the case, María Luisa Piqué, also requested acquittal. The case was the first oral criminal trial in Argentina on the liability of internet platforms for copyrighted content uploaded by users.

=== Other cases ===
In May 2015, Taringa! was dismissed from a complaint presented by María Kodama, the widow and sole heir of the rights of writer Jorge Luis Borges, for alleged infringement of intellectual property. The ruling established that internet intermediary companies cannot be held liable a priori for content shared by users, and that there was no malicious intent on the part of Taringa!.

== Social impact ==
Taringa! users gained media attention on several occasions. In 2010, an Argentine user built a bass guitar and gifted it to Paul McCartney during a concert tour in Argentina. Other cases included a user who found his father after many years through a post on the site, and a couple who built a house using a shipping container and gained widespread attention after publishing their story on the platform.

During social crises, some citizens used Taringa! to share first-hand accounts and make public reports, such as during the looting in the province of Córdoba in 2013 and the street protests in Venezuela in 2014.

In July 2009, Taringa! published a book with Editorial Sudamericana titled "Taringa! Inteligencia Colectiva", a compilation of posts selected by the community. The income from sales was donated to NGO Un Techo para mi País.
