= Mlodzianowski =

Mlodzianowski (also Młodzianowski) is a Polish surname. Notable people with the name are:

- Bryanne-Michelle Mlodzianowski, agent of the Department of Government Efficiency
- Joseph Mlodzianowski, cybersecurity expert and researcher for the Wall of Sheep; see Juice jacking
- Julia Mlodzianowski (1923–1928), victim of serial killer Peter Kudzinowski
- Kazimierz Młodzianowski ((1880–1928), Independent governor of the Pomeranian Voivodeship from 1926 to 1928
- Mateusz Młodzianowski (born 1980), Polish actor
- Stanisław Młodzianowski, commander of the General Sosnkowski (armoured train)
- Tomasz Młodzianowski (1622–1686), Polish Jesuit, preacher, and writer
