= Nohl =

Nohl is a German surname. Notable people with the surname include:

- Karsten Nohl (born 1981), German cryptography expert and hacker
- Ludwig Nohl (1831–1885), German music scholar and writer
- Mary Nohl (1914–2001), American artist

Given name

- Nohl Williams (born 2002), American football player
