= Initial access broker =

Hacker selling access to hacked computers

Initial access brokers (or IABs) are cyber threat actors who specialize in gaining unauthorized access to computer networks and systems and then selling that access to other threat actors such as ransomware. IABs are parts of ransomware as a service economy, also called "cybercrime as a service economy".

== Description ==
IABs use a variety of methods to gain initial access, including exploiting vulnerabilities in remote access services like RDP and VPNs, bruteforcing login credentials, and leveraging malware that steals account information. Access are often sold on auctions in underground criminal forums or directly provided to ransomware affiliate groups to expedite attacks. Europol reported that in 2023 Exploit and XSS, two of the busiest dark web cybercrime forums, were also used as venues by IABs.

IABs seek access to virtual private networks, remote desktop protocol, Web applications, and email servers. Email services will be used to commit spear phishing and business email compromise (BEC).

In 2020, the average price for a network access is $5,400. The median price is $1,000.

By providing initial access, IABs allow other cyber criminals like ransomware groups to more quickly infiltrate networks and launch attacks without wasting time to gain entry themselves. This access as a service model - in analogy to the software as a service model - provides scalability and efficiency to cybercriminal operations. Ransomware in particular has benefited from collaboration with IABs. According to Europol's 2024 assessment, the brokers used by ransomware groups typically specialise in particular technologies and applications, so the brokers a group can call on shape which victims it selects, which can result in some groups concentrating on certain sectors. Europol also assessed that the experienced operators behind the Cl0p ransomware group were likely to have access to high-end IABs able to create zero-day exploits, enabling complex supply-chain attacks such as its May 2023 campaign against the MOVEit file transfer software.

== See also ==
- BlackCat (cyber gang)
- Clop (cyber gang)
- Conti (ransomware)
- Dridex
- Royal (cyber gang)
