= Starbug =

Starbug may refer to:

- Jan Krissler or Starbug (fl. 2002–2018), a German hacker and researcher
- Starbug, a fictional spacecraft in Red Dwarf
