= Neurotechnology (company) =

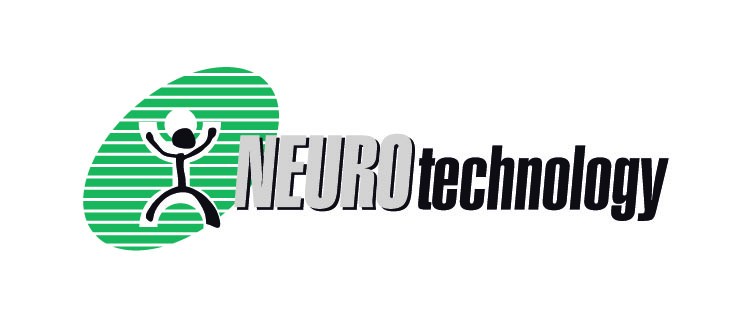
- Formerly: Neurotechnologija
- Industry: AI
- Founded: 1990
- Headquarters: Vilnius, Lithuania
- Website: www.neurotechnology.com

Neurotechnology (previously known as Neurotechnologija) is an algorithm and software development company founded in Vilnius, Lithuania in 1990.

Neurotechnology provides algorithms and neural network services to government agencies and commercial clients, The company develops biometric identification technologies, including fingerprint, facial, iris, voice and palm-print recognition, as well as biometric smart-card systems.

== History ==
Neurotechnology was formed in 1990 in Vilnius, Lithuania, to develop neural network applications in computer vision, biometric identification and artificial intelligence. In 1991, the company released its first fingerprint identification technology for criminal inquiry. In 1997, the company released a fingerprint identification algorithm intended for civilian applications. The company subsequently developed software products that were evaluated by organisations including the US National Institute of Standards and Technology.

In 2009, the Polish Security Printing Works used the Neurotechnology VeriFinger fingerprint recognition technology to issue the E-Passports that were required by all countries in the Schengen Agreement under EU Law.

In 2017, Neurotechnology introduced a 3D printing method based on ultrasonic particle manipulation, intended for manufacturing electronic components and devices.

The DRC's Independent National Electoral Commission deployed the Neurotechnology MegaMatcher ABIS during the 2018 Democratic Republic of Congo general election, uncovering 5.3 million duplicate voter records. Corneille Nangaa Yobeluo, president of the Independent National Electoral Commission, acknowledged the system's role in identifying duplicate voter registrations.

Neurotechnology's fingerprint recognition algorithms have participated in the US National Institute of Standards and Technology (NIST) Proprietary Fingerprint Template (PFT) evaluations, which included 39 algorithms from 22 vendors.

During the 2020 Ghanaian general election, MegaMatcher ABIS was used for fingerprint and facial recognition to identify duplicate registrations in a database of 17,027,641 voters. The system identified 15,860 attempted multiple registrations.

In March 2021, Neurotechnology's MegaMatcher biometric identification software was used in India's Aadhaar identification programme. Neurotechnology and Tata Consultancy Services were selected to provide a biometric deduplication system for Aadhaar using fingerprint, facial and iris recognition.

== Incidents ==
In 2014, hacker Jan Krissler used Neurotechnology's VeriFinger software to reconstruct the fingerprint of German defence minister Ursula von der Leyen from high-resolution photographs.
