= Cryptocurrency ATM =

Kiosks facilitating the purchase of Bitcoin

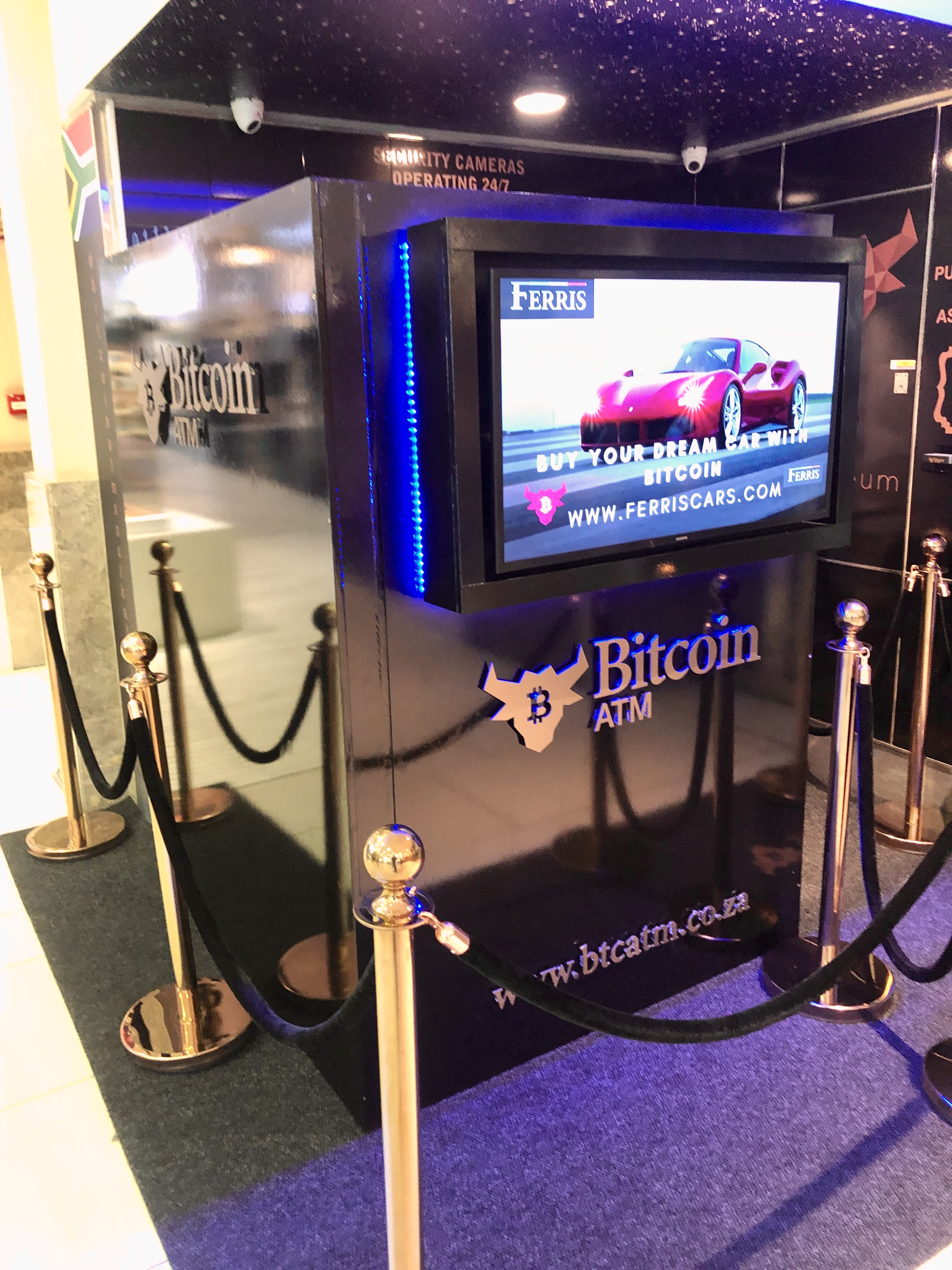
A cryptocurrency ATM in Sandton City, South Africa

A cryptocurrency ATM (automated teller machine) or Bitcoin ATM is a kiosk that allows a person to purchase Bitcoin and other cryptocurrencies by using cash or debit card. Some Bitcoin ATMs offer bidirectional functionality, enabling both the purchase of Bitcoin and the sale of Bitcoin for cash. In some cases, Bitcoin ATM providers require users to have an existing account to transact on the machine.

== History ==
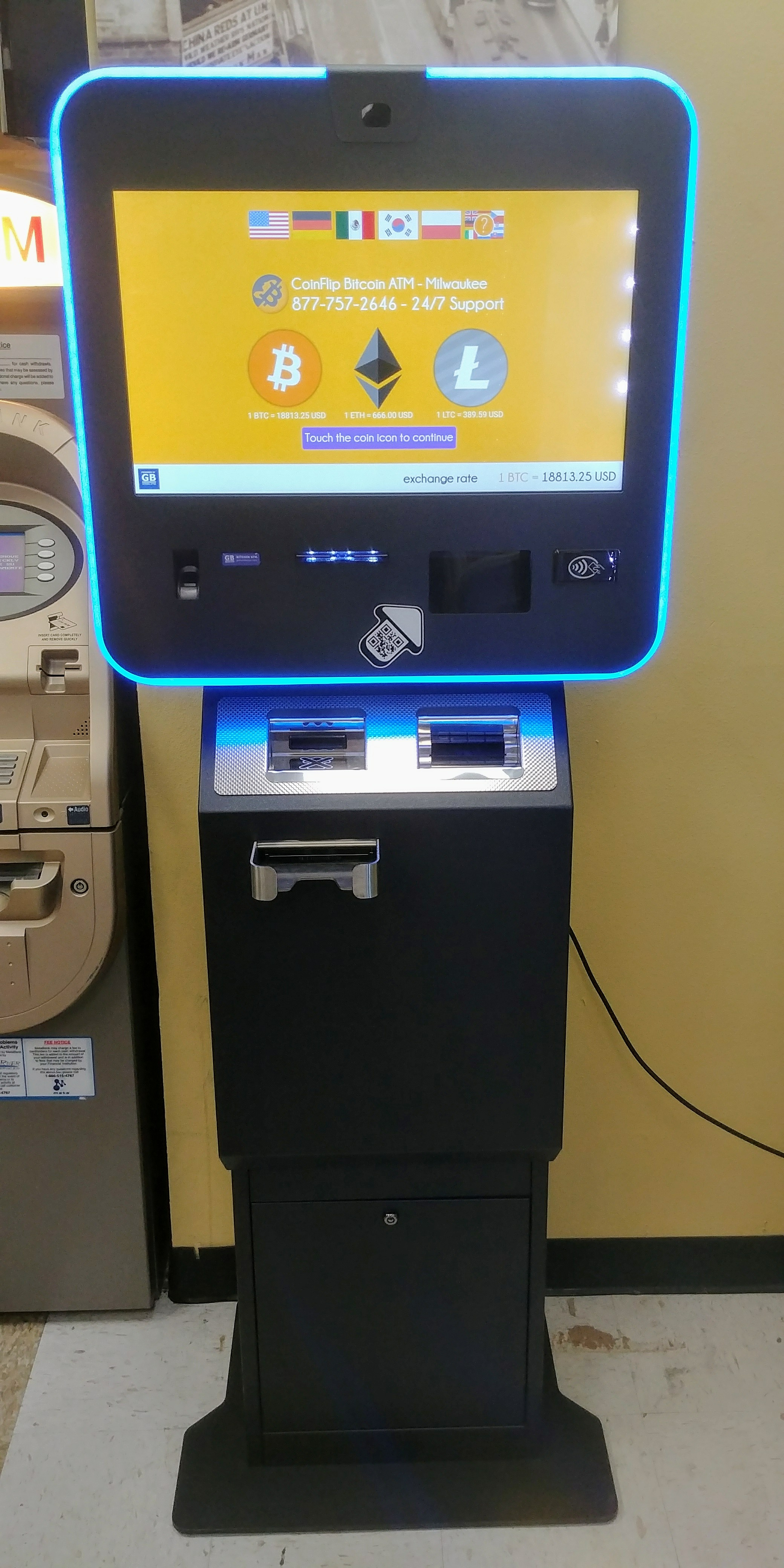
Cryptocurrency ATM in Peoria, Illinois. This model is a "two-way", meaning users may buy or sell Bitcoin and other cryptocurrencies.

On October 29, 2013, a Robocoin machine opened in the Waves coffee shop in downtown Vancouver, Canada. On December 8, 2013, Europe's first Bitcoin ATM was installed in Bratislava, Slovakia. The first machine in the United States went online on February 18, 2014, in a cigar bar in Albuquerque, New Mexico, though it was removed 30 days later. Months later, in May 2014, the first licensed Bitcoin ATM in the U.S. was developed by Coinme and installed at the Spitfire Grill in Seattle, WA.

=== Canada ===
In 2014, Canada was the first country to approve regulation of cryptocurrencies, although it took some time to enforce. In February 2014, the Finance Minister mentioned plans to introduce anti-money laundering and anti-terrorist financing regulations for virtual currencies such as Bitcoin. In June of that year, the Governor General approved an amendment to Bill C-31 that would treat cryptocurrency businesses as Money Services Businesses (MSBs), and the Department of Finance circulated a draft of the proposed regulations in June 2018. As of July 2020, businesses dealing in virtual currencies are considered MSBs by the Financial Transactions and Reports Analysis Centre of Canada (FINTRAC).

In 2018, the Canada Revenue Agency (CRA) commissioned an investigation on Bitcoin ATMs to find out if tax laws were being followed by users. From December 2017 to February 2018, the number of Bitcoin ATMs in Canada increased by 20%. In June 2019, Vancouver was considering a ban on the machines due to money-laundering concerns. In 2026, the federal government announced plans to ban crypto ATMs.

=== Europe ===
As of 2022, there were 1,459 Bitcoin ATMs in Europe, with 17 in the United Kingdom. In March 2022, cryptocurrency ATMs were banned from operating in the UK.

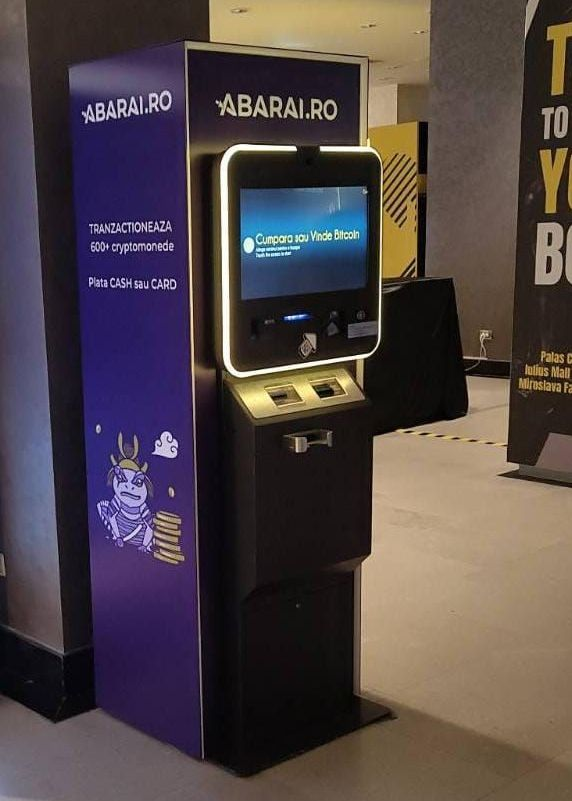
Bitcoin ATM in Romania by user Allucard231

=== United States ===
As of November 2025, there were approximately 28,000 cryptocurrency ATMs operating in the United States. More than 16,000 of these were operated by three companies: Bitcoin Depot, CoinFlip, and Athena Bitcoin.

Most U.S. cryptocurrency ATMs charge transaction fees between 6.5% and 20%. Some operators, including Bitcoin Depot and Coin Cloud, have also used exchange rates that are less favorable to customers than prevailing market rates, effectively increasing the cost of transactions by as much as an additional 20%. According to statements made by Bitcoin Depot to investors, the company targeted middle- and lower-income areas for ATM placement while seeking to minimize its own exposure to cryptocurrency price volatility.

==== Bankruptcies ====
Several cryptocurrency ATM operators have entered bankruptcy proceedings. Others have left the market voluntarily.

In February 2023, Cash Cloud, the operator of the Coin Cloud ATM network, filed for bankruptcy following its exposure to Genesis Capital and the cryptocurrency market downturn that began in 2021.

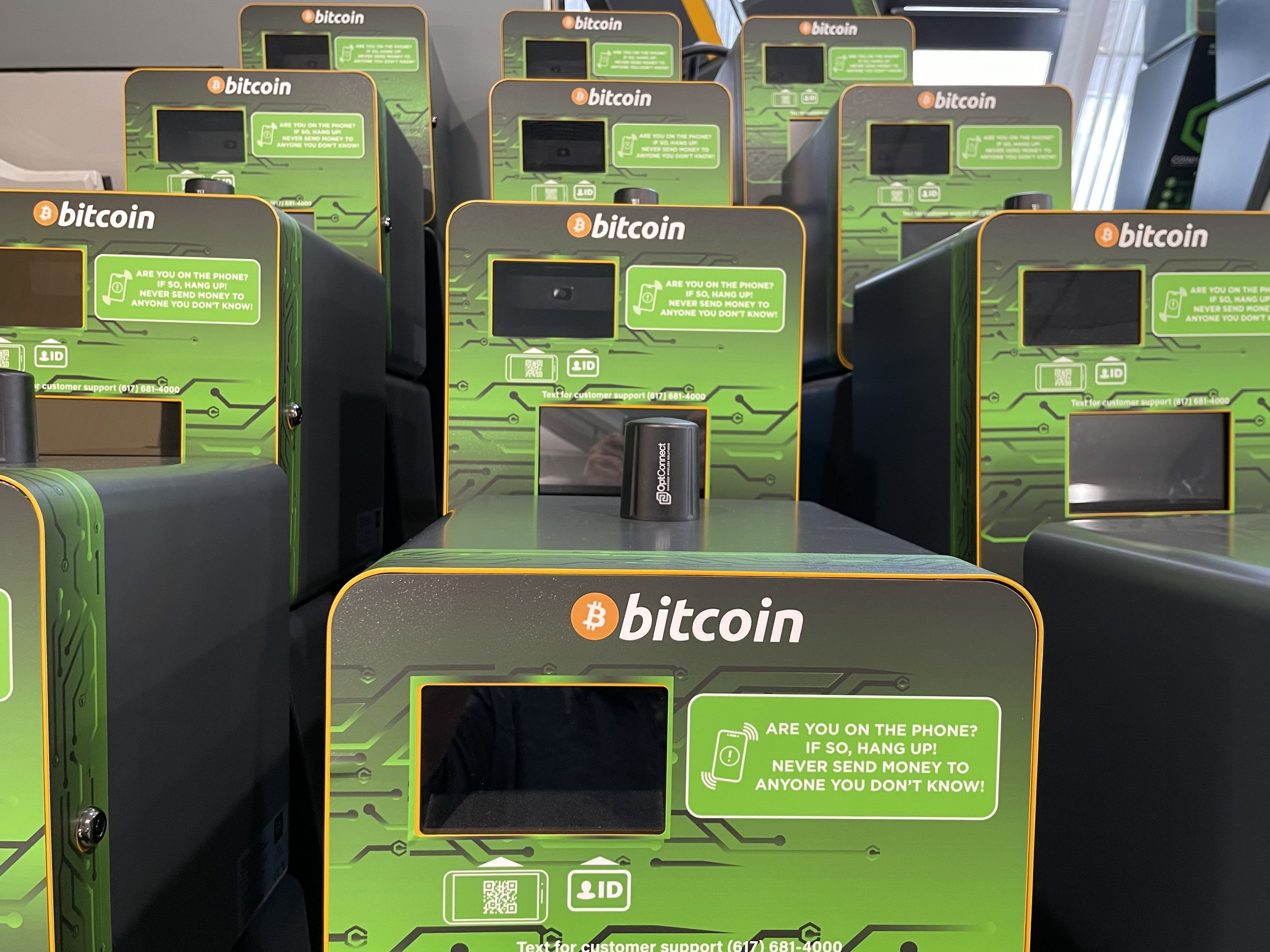
Group of CoinMover Bitcoin ATMs Ready to be Deployed into Stores

In December 2025, Valuto, Inc., which operated the CoinMover Bitcoin ATM network in most New England states and California, filed for Chapter 7 bankruptcy in the U.S. Bankruptcy Court for the District of Massachusetts.

In April 2026, Clark, Sharp & Reynolds, LLC, which operated the Coinsource Bitcoin ATM network, filed for Chapter 7 bankruptcy in the U.S. Bankruptcy Court for the Northern District of Texas.

In May 2026, Bitcoin Depot filed for Chapter 11 bankruptcy protection and ceased operations at more than 9,000 cryptocurrency ATMs, citing a "hostile regulatory environment" and an "unsustainable" business model.

==== Bitcoin of America ====
Bitcoin of America was a cryptocurrency ATM network operated by S and P Solutions, LLC. In an August 2022 letter to the California Department of Financial Protection and Innovation, the company said it operated approximately 2,500 kiosks in more than 30 states and described itself as the fourth-largest cryptocurrency kiosk deployer in the United States.

In March 2023, Ohio authorities announced criminal charges against S and P Solutions and its founder, Sonny Meraban, in connection with the operation of Bitcoin of America kiosks in Northeast Ohio. Authorities seized 52 of the company's kiosks in Cuyahoga and Lorain counties. Bitcoin of America announced that it had ceased operations in March 2023.

In May 2023, the Connecticut Department of Banking announced a settlement with Bitcoin of America over its operation of virtual-currency kiosks without the required money-transmitter license. The company provided $86,000 in restitution to four Connecticut consumers who had lost money to scams involving its kiosks.

In November 2023, Meraban pleaded guilty to two counts of receiving stolen property, two counts of license requirement violations, and one count of possessing criminal tools, all felonies. As part of the case, he was required to surrender approximately 104.84 bitcoin, then valued at about $4 million, as well as other assets and restitution to several victims. He was subsequently sentenced to five years of probation.

==== Current Environment ====
Several analysts and regulators have compared U.S. Bitcoin ATMs to payday loan businesses, arguing that both can increase the cost of poverty by charging comparatively high fees to consumers with limited access to mainstream financial services. Former bitcoin ATM operator DigitalMint claims to have exited the market over moral and ethical concerns about profiting from rampant fraud.

Some cryptocurrency ATMs used in the United States are manufactured overseas. The Czech company General Bytes, for example, has sold thousands of machines to U.S. operators. Cryptocurrency transactions are also available through other retail networks. Through Coinme, bitcoin can be exchanged in the United States for local currency at participating MoneyGram locations and Coinstar machines.

State regulation of cryptocurrency ATMs increased substantially in 2026. Indiana prohibited the operation of virtual-currency kiosks in March 2026. Tennessee subsequently enacted Public Chapter 766, which prohibits the installation and operation of virtual-currency kiosks in the state. The law took effect July 1, 2026, and makes a knowing violation a Class A misdemeanor. Minnesota enacted a statewide prohibition on virtual-currency kiosks effective August 1, 2026, with operators required to remove publicly accessible kiosks by December 31, 2026.

=== South Africa ===
In South Africa, ATMs accept the Rand (ZAR) and transactions over 10,000ZAR ($667) require ID verification. These ATMs are mostly found in Cape Town, Durban, Johannesburg and Pretoria.

== Compliance ==
According to AML/KYC standards applicable in the jurisdiction where their ATMs are placed, Bitcoin ATM operators need to adjust the limits on deposits and withdrawals. In some jurisdictions, this requires a money transmitter license.

In the United States, the Bank Secrecy Act (BSA) requires Bitcoin ATM operators to establish and maintain an effective written anti-money laundering program reasonably designed to prevent ATMs from being used to facilitate money laundering and the financing of terrorist activities. Bitcoin ATM operators must be registered as Money Service Businesses and are regulated by the Financial Crimes Enforcement Network (FinCEN).

In March 2022, the Financial Conduct Authority (FCA) in the United Kingdom declared that all cryptocurrency ATMs in the country were illegal and would need to be shut down. None of the ATMs' operators had successfully registered with the agency. The FCA cited a failure to comply with know your customer (KYC) laws, which track and prevent money laundering, as well as the high risk to customers, due to a lack of regulation and protection. At the time, Coin ATM Radar listed 81 such ATMs in the country.

On 28 February 2025, Olumide Osunkoya was sentenced to four years in prison after pleading guilty to running crypto ATMs without FCA registration, as well as forgery and other offences. According to the FCA, it was the first UK sentence for unregistered cryptoasset activity.

== See also ==
- Digital currency
- Cryptocurrency
- Cryptocurrencies in Europe
