= Athena Bitcoin =

American cryptocurrency company

- Types: Pinnacle Financial Solutions Ltd

Athena Bitcoin is a cryptocurrency company that operates over 4,000 bitcoin ATMs in the United States. Athena Bitcoin, Inc. is owned by Athena Bitcoin Global and traded as ABIT:PKC.

In 2021, Athena Bitcoin planned to invest over $1 million to gradually install approximately 1,500 cryptocurrency ATMs across El Salvador to facilitate Bitcoin transactions, especially for handling remittances.

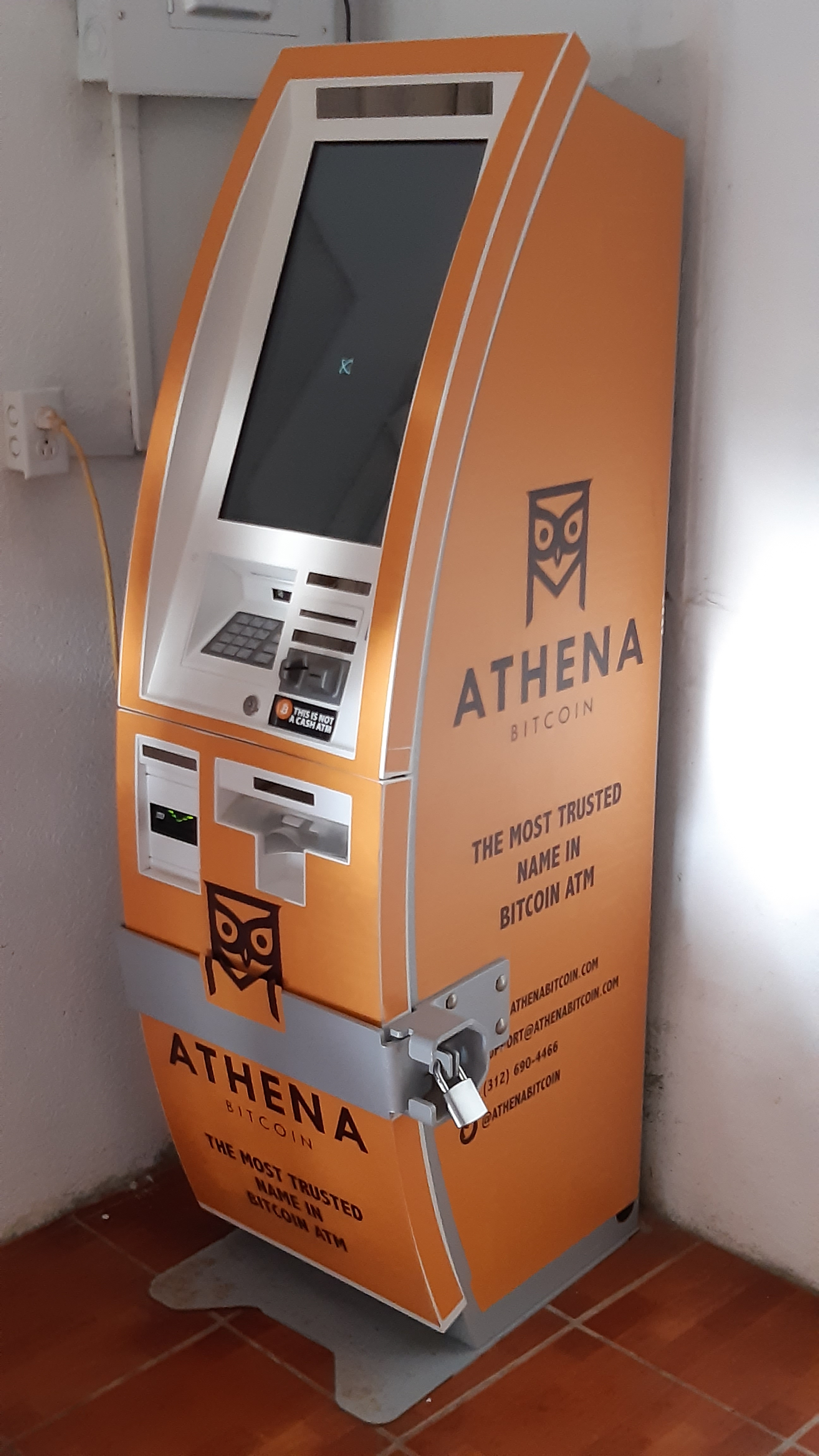
An Athena Bitcoin ATM in El Zonte, El Salvador

== Lawsuits ==
In 2025 Brian Schwalb, Attorney General for the District of Columbia sued Athena Bitcoin alleging that 93% of deposits in the first six months of the company opening in DC were fraud related. Athena Bitcoin responded saying they have strong safeguards in place. They operate 138 ATMs in Maryland, where another lawsuit is taking place. They charge fees of up to 26%. They are also being sued by AML Software who is accusing the Bitcoin ATM operator of trying to steal its source code.
