= 2024 cyberattack on Kadokawa and Niconico =

Cyberattack on Japanese websites

- Date: June 8 – August 5, 2024
- Location: Japan
- Type: Cyberattack, Data breach, Ransomware attack
- Motive: Money
- Target: Niconico, Kadokawa Group's websites
- Perpetrator: BlackSuit
- Property damage: 254,241 users' data leaked

On the morning of June 8, 2024, Kadokawa's official website and the Japanese video-sharing platform Niconico suffered a ransomware cyberattack by the Russian-linked hacker group BlackSuit, who claimed responsibility for the attack.

== Background ==
Niconico is a Japanese video-sharing platform launched in 2006. Niconico's owner, Dwango, is a subsidiary of Kadokawa Corporation. According to Alexa Internet, the site is the 14th most visited website in Japan as of May 1, 2022.

On June 3, 2024, Kadokawa Taiwan reported a cyberattack that leaked personal and corporate information.

Two days after the initial attack, Wired stated that ransomware attacks are "accelerating in 2024".

Japan's cyber security has been criticized for lacking IT expert specialists, with about 90% of domestic companies having none according to a think tank survey. One day before the initial attack, Japanese prime minister Fumio Kishida ordered his minister to craft a bill boosting Japan's "active cyber defense".

== Attack ==
A connection problem with Kadokawa Group services, including Niconico, was reported from around 3:30 (JST) on June 8, 2024. Dwango stopped all Niconico services with issues at around 6:00 (JST) on the same day and conducted maintenance.

On June 9, Kadokawa reported the incident to the police, expert specialists, and the Kanto Local Finance Bureau. On June 14, upon investigation, Kadokawa confirmed that the outage was caused by a ransomware cyberattack, and it was also found that despite remotely shutting down the website's services, the attackers were observed restarting the servers to continue to spread the malware; in response, Kadokawa physically disconnected the server's power and communication cable. On the same day, Niconico set up a temporary website detailing the situation.

On June 27, the Russian-linked hacker group "BlackSuit" published a statement on the dark web claiming responsibility for the attack and threatening to publish the 1.5 terabytes of stolen data of business partners and user information unless a ransom was paid by July 1.

On July 10, Kadokawa released a statement warning the public that disseminating any leaked information from the data breach would result in legal action.

Niconico and Kadokawa's official website services went back online on August 5.

== Impact ==
Niconico announced that all its scheduled programming would be canceled until the end of July.

During this attack, Kadokawa's stock price declined, and by July 3, Kadokawa's stock price had dropped by over 20%. Kadokawa's publishing business and manufacturing ended briefly put on hold after the attack, and e-book distribution was delayed. Kadokawa Umbrella, its online shop, was affected and could not receive or ship orders.

In November 2024 Kadokawa said it expected to record an extraordinary loss of ¥2.3 billion (about US$15 million) for the fiscal year ending March 2025 because of the cyberattack.

Kadokawa Dwango Educational Institute, a private correspondence high school owned by Kadokawa, was affected by the attack but restored its services on June 10.

== Aftermath and investigation ==
Niconico implemented new security measures after the attack as well as rebuilding its systems.

On August 6, Kadokawa's investigation revealed that a phishing attack was the possible cause of the attack. It also confirmed that 254,241 people's information was leaked during the attack. Among the leaked data, 186,269 are from the Kadokawa Dwango Educational Institute.

On December 12, 2024, BlackSuit emailed the group executives of Kadokawa it had received the $2.9 million of cryptocurrency from the company.

On July 24, 2025, U.S. law enforcement agencies working with international partners took down four servers and nine domains used by BlackSuit.

== See also ==
- List of cyberattacks
- List of data breaches
