= Cisco Systems VPN Client =

Virtual private network software

- Cisco VPN Client on Windows 7
- Developer: Cisco Systems
- Stable release: Windows: 5.0.07.0440 / March 15, 2011; 14 years ago; macOS: 4.9.01.0180 / February 5, 2009; 17 years ago
- Preview release: 4.9.01.0230 for Mac / July 27, 2010; 15 years ago
- Operating system: Windows, Mac OS X 10.4 and 10.5, Solaris UltraSPARC, Linux (Intel)
- Size: x86: 7.63 MB; x64: 4.78 MB
- Available in: English
- Type: VPN software
- License: Proprietary
- Website: www.cisco.com/c/en/us/products/security/vpn-endpoint-security-clients/index.html

Cisco Systems VPN Client is a software application for connecting to virtual private networks based on Internet Key Exchange version 1.

On July 29, 2011, Cisco announced the end of life of the product. No further product updates were released after July 30, 2012, and support ceased on July 29, 2014. The Support page with documentation links was taken down on July 30, 2016, replaced with an Obsolete Status Notification.

It was succeeded by Cisco AnyConnect Secure Mobility Client.

== Availability ==
The software is not free but is often installed on university and business computers in accordance with a site-license. As with most corporate licenses, administrators are allowed to freely distribute the software to users within their network.

The open-source vpnc client can connect to most VPNs supported by the official client.

== Compatibility ==
VPN Client 4.9.01.0230 beta added support for Mac OS X 10.6. Stable version 4.9.01.0180 appears to lack that support; 4.9.00.0050 explicitly did not support versions of Mac OS X later than 10.5.

VPN Client 5.0.07.0290 added support for 64-bit versions of Windows Vista and Windows 7.

== Security ==
The client uses profile configuration files (.pcf) that store VPN passwords either hashed with type 7, or stored as plaintext. A vulnerability has been identified, and those passwords can easily be decoded using software or online services. To work around these issues, network administrators are advised to use the Mutual Group Authentication feature, or use unique passwords (that aren't related to other important network passwords).

== See also ==
- Dynamic Multipoint Virtual Private Network
- Cisco ASA, the product line that replaced Cisco VPN Concentrator on the server side
