= Juice jacking =

Mobile security risk

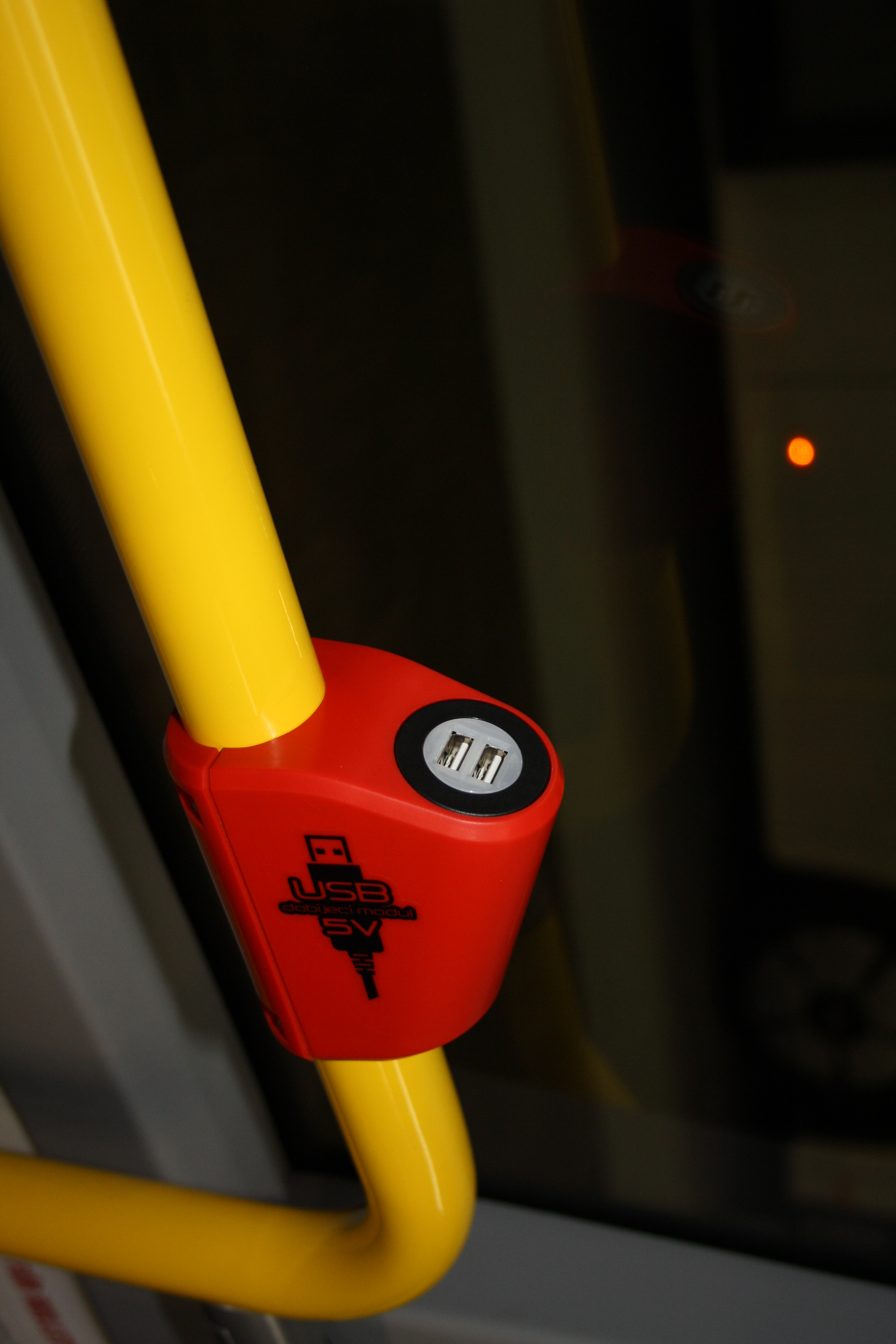
USB chargers in a public bus

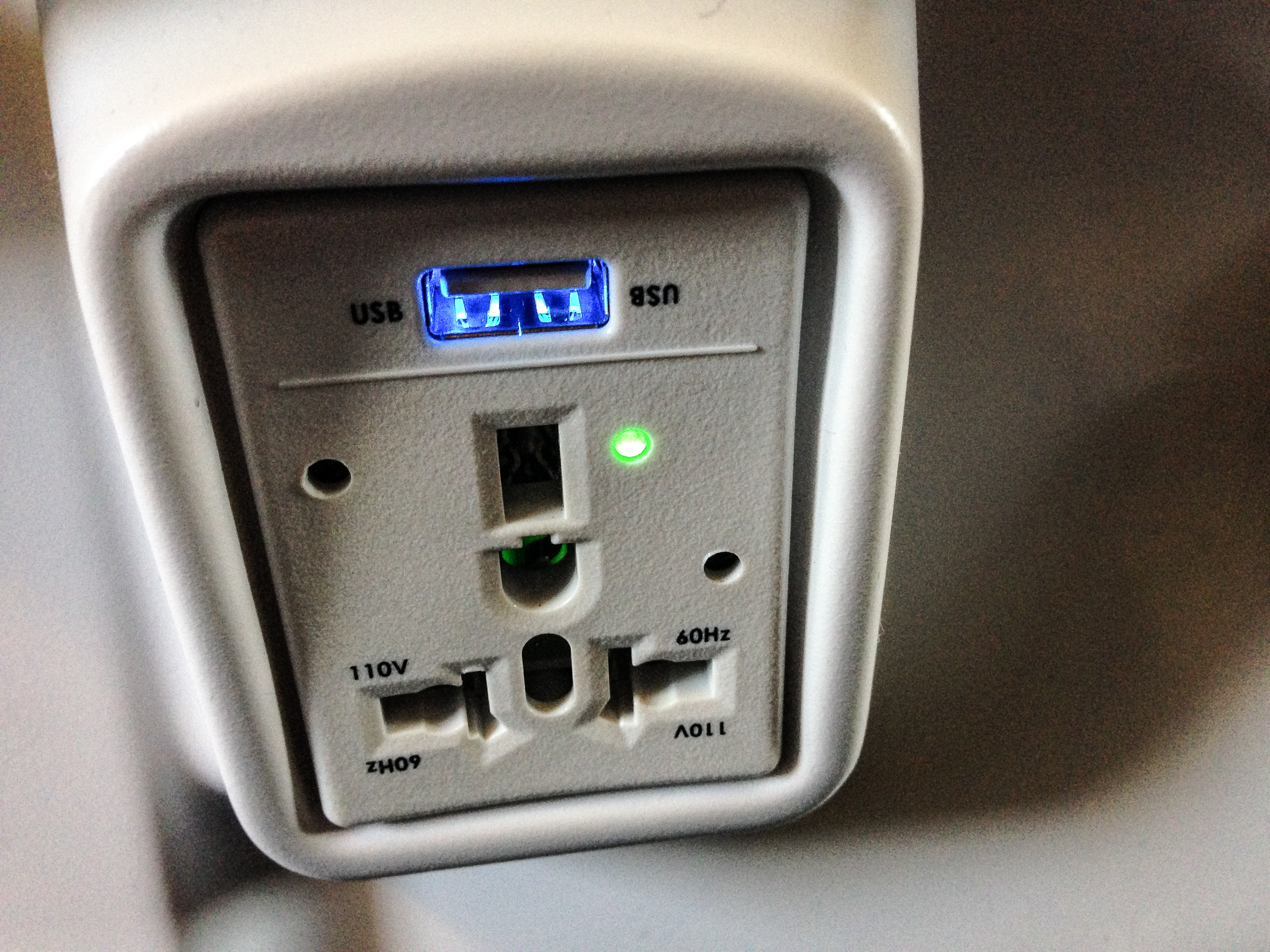
International AC outlet and USB charger in an airplane

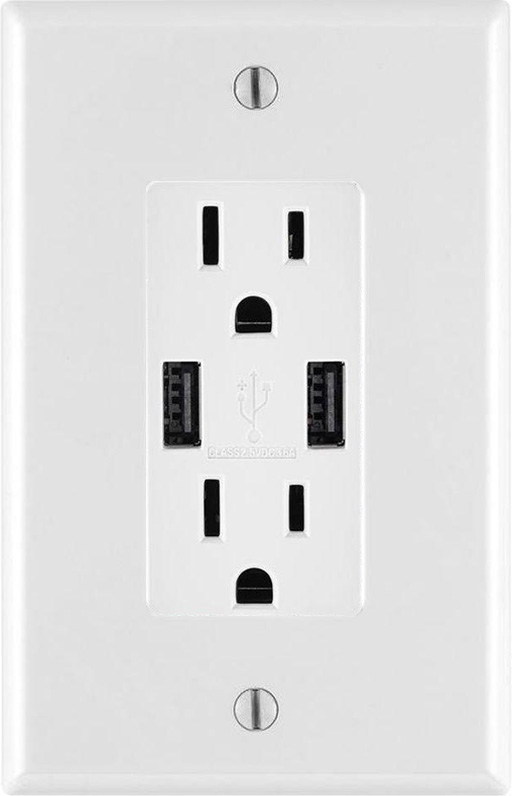
North American AC outlet with USB charger

Juice jacking is a theoretical type of compromise of devices like smartphones and tablets which use the same cable for charging and data transfer, typically a USB cable. The goal of the attack is to either install malware on the device, or to surreptitiously copy potentially sensitive data.

While researchers have demonstrated charging-port attacks in controlled settings, as of May 2023, multiple reviews have found no credible reported cases of juice jacking on mobile OSs outside of research efforts, and experts generally assess the risk to typical users as low relative to other threats. In 2025, researchers from Graz University of Technology presented "ChoiceJacking" at the 34th USENIX Security Symposium. In the researchers' own tests, this family of attacks got around the existing juice-jacking mitigations in Android and iOS.

== Published research ==
The Wall of Sheep, an event at Defcon, has set up and allowed public access to an informational juice jacking kiosk each year at Defcon since 2011. Their intent is to bring awareness of this attack to the general public. Each of the informational juice jacking kiosks set up at the Wall of Sheep village have included a hidden CPU, which is used in some way to notify the user that they should not plug their devices in to public charging kiosks. The first informational juice jacking kiosk included a screen that would change from "Free charging station" to a warning message that the user "should not trust public charging stations with their devices". One of the researchers who designed the charging station for the Wall of Sheep has given public presentations showcasing more malicious acts that could be taken via the kiosk, such as data theft, device tracking and information on compromising existing charging kiosks.

Security researcher Kyle Osborn released an attack framework called P2P-ADB in 2012, which utilized USB On-The-Go to connect an attacker's phone to a target victim's device. This framework included examples and proof of concepts that would allow attackers to unlock locked phones, steal data from a phone including authentication keys granting the attacker access to the target device owner's Google Account.

Security researcher graduates and students from Georgia Tech released a proof-of-concept malicious tool "Mactans" that utilized the USB charging port on Apple mobile devices at the 2013 Blackhat USA security briefings. They utilized inexpensive hardware components to construct a small sized malicious wall charger that could infect an iPhone with the then-current version of iOS with malicious software while it was being charged. The software could defeat any security measures built into iOS and mask itself in the same way Apple masks background processes in iOS.

Security researchers Karsten Nohl and Jakob Lell from SRLabs published their research on BadUSB during the 2014 Blackhat USA security briefings. Their presentation on this attack mentions that a cellphone or tablet device charging on an infected computer would be one of the simplest method of propagating the BadUSB vulnerability. They include example malicious firmware code that would infect Android devices with BadUSB.

Researchers at Aries Security and the Wall of Sheep later revisited the juice jacking concept in 2016. They set up a "Video Jacking" charging station, able to record the mirrored screen from phones plugged into their malicious charging station. Affected devices at the time included Android devices supporting SlimPort or MHL protocols over USB, as well as the most recent iPhone using an Apple Lightning charging cable connector.

Researchers at Symantec disclosed their findings on an attack they called "Trustjacking" during the 2018 RSA Conference. The researchers identified that when a user approves access for a computer on an iOS device over USB, that this trusted access level is also applied to the device's iTunes API, which is accessible over Wi-Fi. This would allow attackers access to an iOS device even after the user had unplugged the device from a malicious or infected USB-based charge source.

A researcher who goes by _MG_ released a USB cable implant they called the "O.MG Cable". The O.MG Cable has a microcontroller embedded within the cable and a visual inspection would likely not detect a difference between the O.MG cable and a normal charging cable. The O.MG Cable allows attackers or red team penetration testers to remotely issue commands to the cable over Wi-Fi, and have those commands run on the host computer with the O.MG cable plugged in to it.

In 2025, Florian Draschbacher, Lukas Maar, Mathias Oberhuber and Stefan Mangard of Graz University of Technology presented "ChoiceJacking" at the 34th USENIX Security Symposium. Mobile operating systems had added prompts asking the user to confirm a data connection from a USB host. The ChoiceJacking techniques for Android and iOS let a malicious charger fake user input and approve its own data connection. That got around these prompts. In the researchers' evaluation the attacks reached sensitive user files on all tested devices from 8 vendors, including the 6 largest by market share. On devices from two vendors, files could be extracted even while the device was locked. All but one of the vendors notified, including Google, Samsung, Xiaomi and Apple, acknowledged the attacks and were working on mitigations.

== Public warnings and popular culture ==
Brian Krebs was the first to report on this attack and he coined the term "juice jacking". After seeing the informational cell phone charging kiosk set up in the Wall of Sheep at DefCon 19 in August 2011, he wrote the first article on his security journalism site, "Krebs on Security". The Wall of Sheep researchers, including Brian Markus, Joseph Mlodzianowski and Robert Rowley, designed the kiosk as an information tool to bring awareness of the potential attack vector and they have discussed, but not publicly released, tools to perform malicious actions on the charging devices.

An episode of the hacking series Hak5 released in September 2012 showcased a number of attacks that can be conducted using an attack framework named P2P-ADB released by Kyle Osborn. The P2P-ADB attack framework discussed utilizes one phone to attack another phone over a USB On-the-Go connection.

In late 2012, a document was released by the National Security Agency (NSA) warning government employees who travel about the threat of juice jacking. The document reminded readers to only use their personal power charging cables during overseas travel, to not charge in public kiosks, and to not utilize other people's computers for charging.

The Android Hackers Handbook released in March 2014 has dedicated sections discussing both juice jacking and the ADB-P2P framework.

Juice jacking was the central focus on an episode of CSI: Cyber. Season 1: Episode 9, "L0M1S" aired in April 2015.

In November 2019, the Los Angeles Deputy District Attorney issued a public service announcement warning about the risks of juice jacking during the upcoming holiday travel season. This PSA came under scrutiny due to the fact that no public cases have come to light related to malicious charging kiosks found in public or any criminal cases being tried under the Los Angeles District Attorney's purview at the time of the PSA.

On April 6, 2023, the FBI Denver X.com account published a warning that "bad actors have figured out ways to use public USB ports ..." as if the attack vector were novel. At nearly the same time, the FCC updated a warning published in 2019 about multiple hacking attempts (lacking citations). "In some cases, criminals may have intentionally left cables plugged in at charging stations." This announcement, along with tweets on April 11 was later criticized by both Slate and Ars Technica as a form of bad communication: the post from the FBI was simply a generic warning that juice jacking was possible and not spurned by any recent developments, but news outlets interpreted this as a new attack vector consumers need to be aware of.

The Transportation Security Administration (TSA) later warned air travelers in a Facebook post that hackers could plant malware in USB ports. It advised them not to plug phones directly into USB ports at airports and to bring a power brick or battery pack instead.

== Mitigation ==
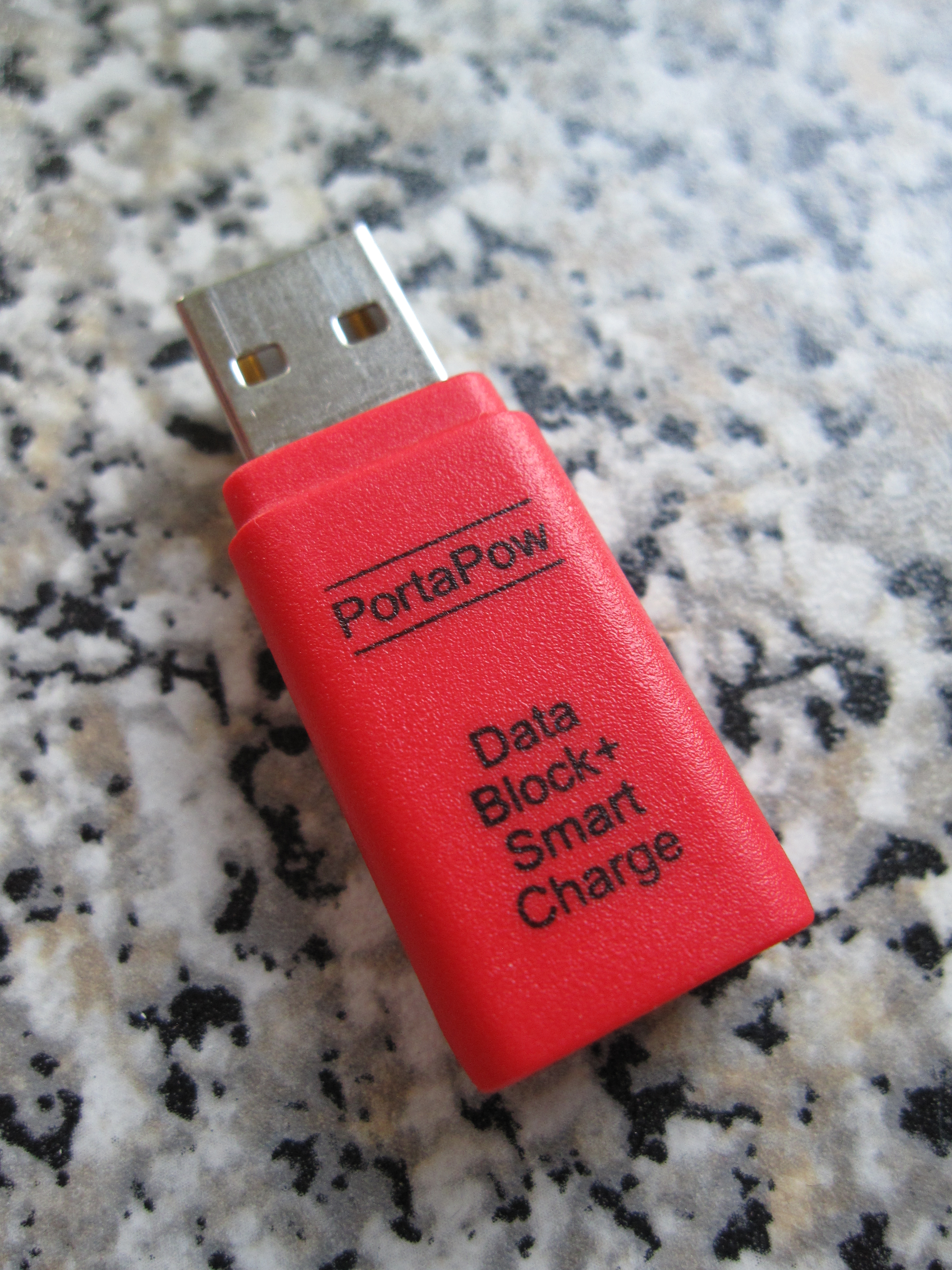
A USB data blocker

Since 2013, both iOS and Android devices have received software updates to mitigate the threat.

Apple's iOS has taken multiple security measures to reduce the attack surface over USB including no longer allowing the device to automatically mount as a hard drive when plugged in over USB, as well as release security patches for vulnerabilities such as those exploited by Mactans.

Android devices commonly prompt the user before allowing the device to be mounted as a hard drive when plugged in over USB. In Android Jelly Bean released in 2012, Android implemented a whitelist verification step to prevent attackers from accessing the Android Debug Bridge without authorization. Android 16 introduced Advanced Protection mode, which prevents use of the USB port for data transfer when the device is locked.

=== Mitigation by hardware ===
Juice jacking is not possible if a device is charged via a trusted AC adapter or battery backup device, or if using a USB cable with only power wires. For USB cables with data wires, a USB data blocker (sometimes called a USB condom) can be connected between device and charging port to disallow a data connection.
