= Jan Krissler =

German computer scientist and biometry hacker

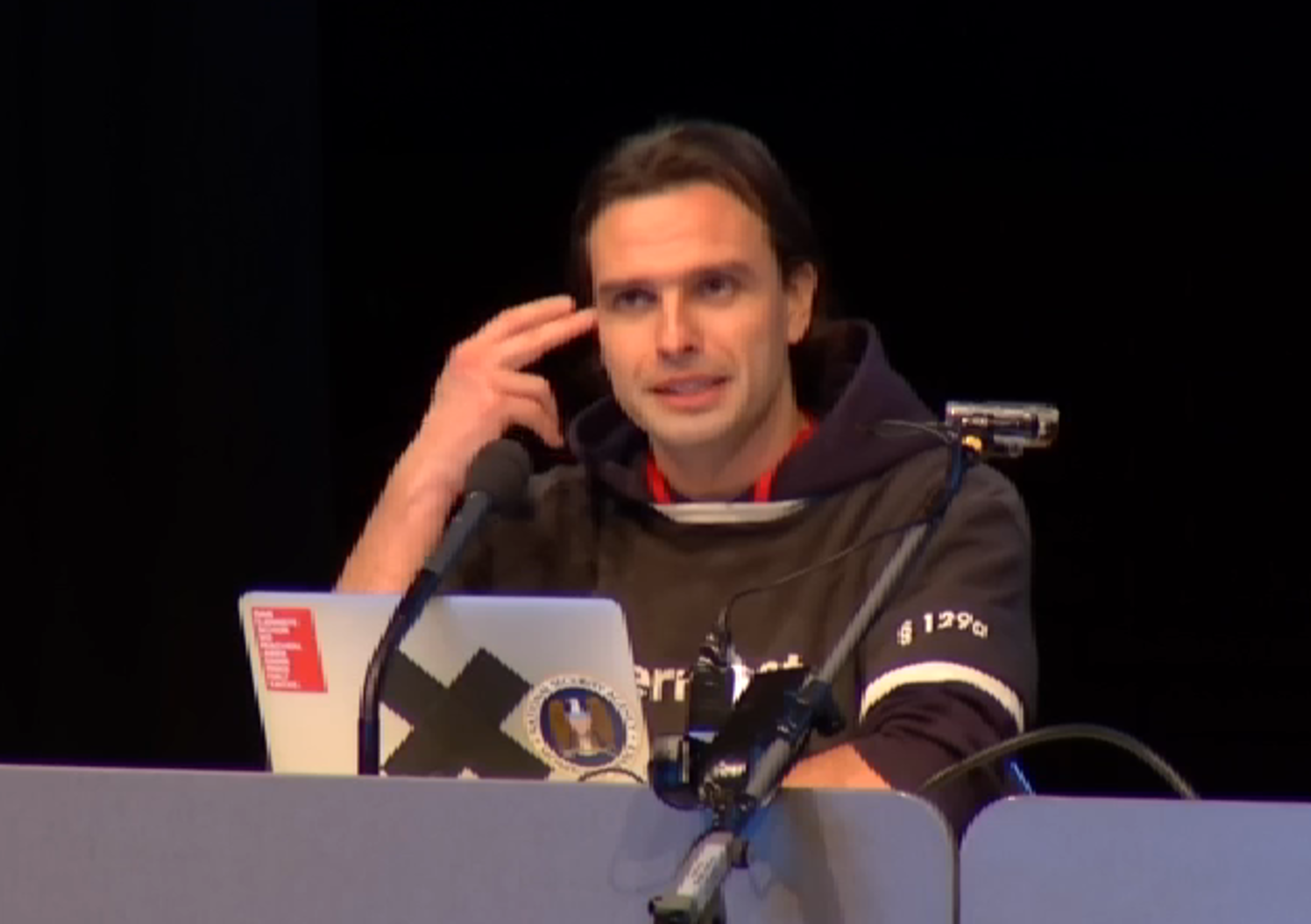
- Other name: Starbug
- Education: HTW Berlin (Dipl.)
- Occupations: computer scientist, hacker
- Known for: Biometry hacking

Jan Krissler, better known by his pseudonym starbug, is a German computer scientist and hacker. He is best known for his work on defeating biometric systems, most prominently the iPhone's TouchID. He is also an active member of the German and European hacker community.

== Fingerprints of prominent German politicians ==
Krissler, along with Chaos Computer Club published the fingerprints of then Interior Minister Wolfgang Schäuble as a means of protest as well as proof of concept. He shot traces of a glass used by Schäuble using a digital camera and tweaked it digitally. Previously, Schäubles Ministry of the Interior had introduced biometric passports which included a digital copy of the holder's fingerprint.

He further refined the attack in 2014 when he reproduced Minister of Defense Ursula von der Leyen's fingerprint from a high resolution press photo. The attack was presented during 2014's Chaos Communication Congress.

In 2014, Neurotechnology's "VeriFinger" was used by Jan Krissler to recreate the German defense minister Ursula von der Leyen's fingerprint.

== Scientific work ==
Aside from his activities and popular papers published as an activist, Krissler is also a published scientist. His early works looked into the security of biometric systems. Later, Krissler researched the foundations of optic fibre systems and the development of novel attacks on smart cards.

From 2014 onwards, his work has focused on novel methods of defeating biometric systems. He is internationally recognized for his research on the risks emanating from high resolution smartphone cameras, which may allow malicious actors to covertly steal fingerprints. Deficiencies in biometric payment systems is another field of his research.

Currently, Krissler is a research assistant at TU Berlin working with Jean-Pierre Seifert's research group.
