= Internet Crime Complaint Center =

Division of the FBI for Internet activity

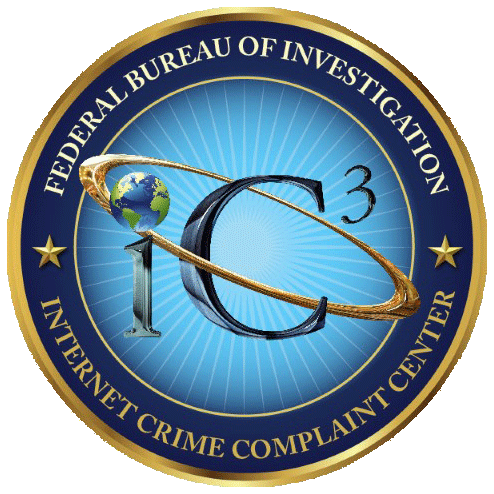
Seal of the FBI Internet Crime Complaint Center

The Internet Crime Complaint Center (IC3) is a division of the Federal Bureau of Investigation (FBI) concerning suspected Internet-facilitated criminal activity. The IC3 gives victims a convenient and easy-to-use reporting mechanism that alerts authorities of suspected criminal or civil violations on the Internet. The IC3 develops leads and notifies law enforcement agencies at the federal, state, local and international level. Information sent to the IC3 is analyzed and disseminated for investigative and intelligence purposes to law enforcement and for public awareness.

== History ==
The IC3 was founded in 2000 as the Internet Fraud Complaint Center (IFCC), and was tasked with gathering data on crimes committed online such as fraud, scams, and thefts. Other crimes tracked by the center included intellectual property rights matters, computer intrusions, economic espionage, online extortion, international money laundering, identity theft, and other Internet-facilitated crimes.

With the realization that crimes facilitated online have a chance to overlap with other crimes, and that not all crimes committed or facilitated online are just fraud, the IFCC was renamed to the Internet Crime Complaint Center in October 2003 to better reflect the broad character of such matters, and to minimize the need for one to distinguish online fraud from other potentially overlapping cyber crimes.

In 2018 the IC3 set up a Recovery Asset Team, which works with financial institutions and FBI field offices to have funds from fraudulent transactions frozen. In 2025 the team acted on 3,900 incidents and froze $679,013,183, a success rate of 58%.

== Annual reports ==
The IC3 publishes an annual report drawn from the complaints it receives. The 2025 report recorded 1,008,597 complaints and $20.877 billion in reported losses, a 26% rise in losses compared with 2024. Investment fraud caused the largest losses, $8,648,617,756 from 72,984 complaints, and complainants aged 60 and over reported losses of $7.748 billion. By the time the report was published, the IC3 had received more than 10 million complaints in total and was averaging almost 3,000 a day.

== See also ==
- List of convicted computer criminals
- National White Collar Crime Center
