= OGUsers =

Internet forum

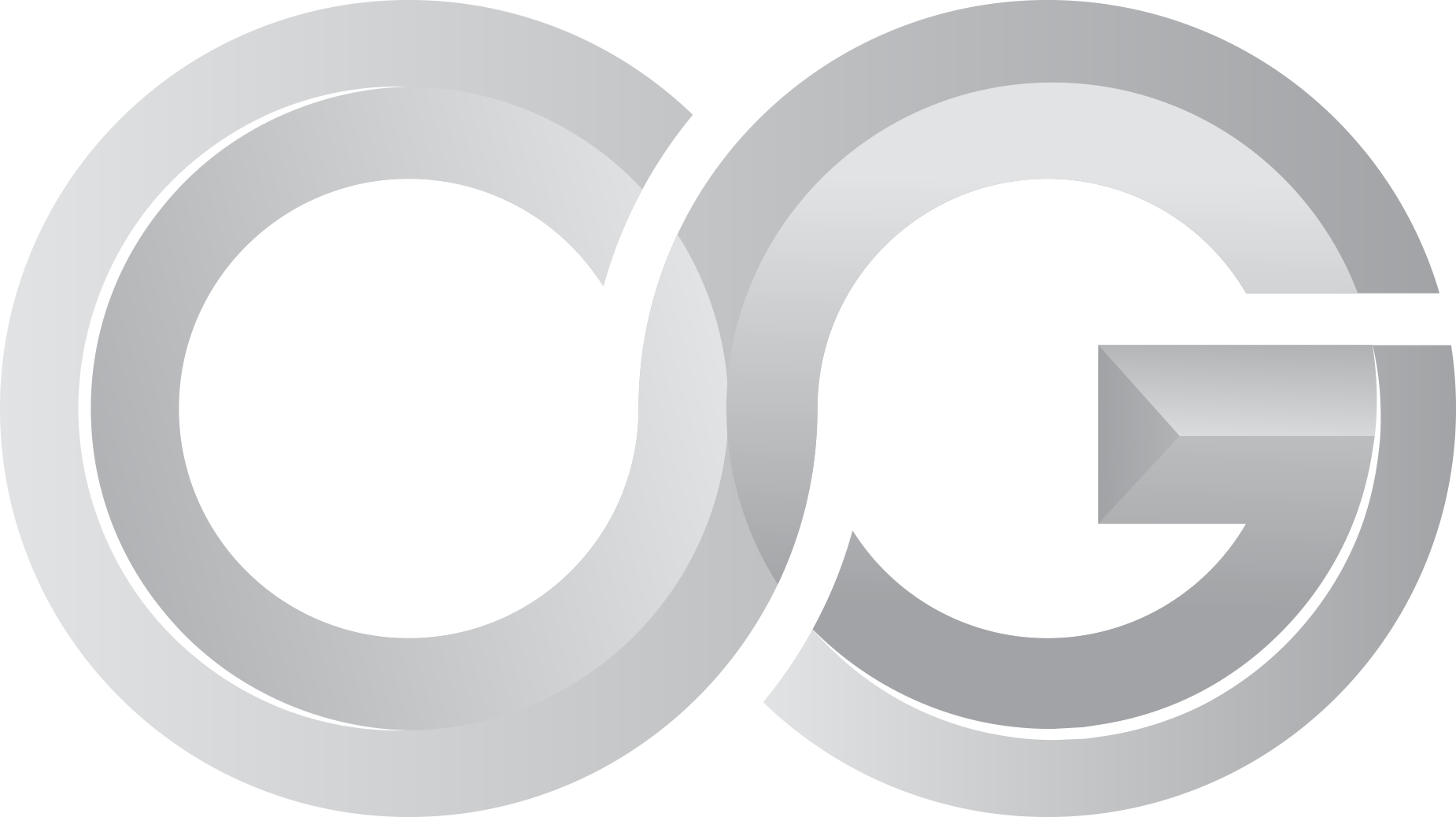
- Logo
- Website type: Internet forum
- Available in: English
- Owner: "arc"
- Founder: "Ace"
- Website: oguser.com
- Advertising: Yes
- Commercial: Yes
- Registration: Optional (required to participate)
- Launched: April 2017; 9 years ago

OGUsers (OGU), officially named OGU, briefly operating as FLIPD during 2022-2023, is an Internet forum that facilitates discussing and buying social media accounts and online usernames. Established in early 2017, the website is dedicated to the buying and selling of "rare" or "OG" online accounts that are considered valuable due to their name, age or unique features such as Minecraft MineCon capes. The website mostly acts as a platform for cybercrime and the harassment of individuals for access to their online accounts, though unlike cybercrime forums, OGUsers have rules against fraud, though, hard to enforce due to the nature of the forum, despite the forum banning stolen accounts, some high-tier accounts traded on the forum are stolen accounts. Several high-profile incidents have been linked to the forum, most notably the 2020 Twitter account hijacking.

== Incidents ==
The site has been linked to various SIM swap scams, where discussion took place on identity theft methods to change login information for online accounts.

Graham Ivan Clark, regarded as the "mastermind" behind the 2020 Twitter account hijacking, was a former forum member. Two participants, Mason Sheppard and Nima Fazeli, were brokers in selling Twitter handles on the website.

In 2020, a man from Tennessee died from a heart attack during a swatting. An individual in the United Kingdom was attempting to coerce the man for an online username by utilizing tactics of the site, with him later being sentenced to five years in prison.

=== Security breaches ===
The website was hacked in May 2019, with the administrator of RaidForums uploading the website database for anyone to access. In December 2020, the website was hacked again, and user data was stolen.

== Reception ==
Brian Krebs, an American journalist and investigative reporter known for the coverage of cybercriminals, has described the forum as "overrun with shady characters who are there mainly to rip off other members." In his report, he described how Facebook, Instagram, TikTok, and Twitter have taken steps to crack down on users of the forums involved in the trafficking of hijacked accounts. Facebook told Krebs that users on the forum uses various tactics, such as harassment, intimidation, hacking, coercion, extortion, sextortion, SIM swapping, and swatting.

== See also ==
- BlackHatWorld
- BreachForums
- Dark0de
- Hack Forums
- Hydra Market
- Nulled
- RaidForums
- ShinyHunters
