= Dark0de =

Online black marketplace and cybercrime forum

Darkode
- Website type: Internet forum
- Available in: English
- Founder: Sp3cial1st
- Advertising: Yes
- Commercial: Yes
- Launched: 2007; 19 years ago
- Current status: Offline

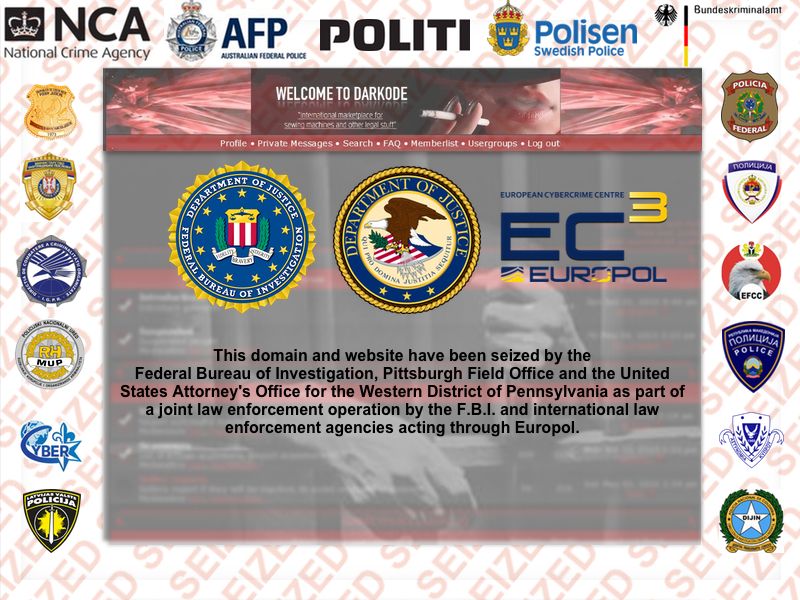
The message displayed on the homepage of Darkode upon its domain being seized during Operation Shrouded Horizon

dark0de, also known as Darkode, was a cybercrime forum and black marketplace described by Europol as "the most prolific English-speaking cybercriminal forum to date". The site, which was launched in 2007, served as a venue for the sale and trade of hacking services, botnets, malware, stolen personally identifiable information, credit card information, hacked server credentials, and other illicit goods and services.

== History ==
In early 2013, Darkode suffered from a large DDoS attack, moving from bulletproof hosting provider Santrex to another provider named "Off-sho.re", the latter being a participant of the Stophaus campaign against Spamhaus. The site has had an ongoing feud with security researcher Brian Krebs.

In April 2014, various site users were attacked via the Heartbleed exploit, gaining access to private areas of the site.

== Takedown ==
The forum was the target of Operation Shrouded Horizon, an international law enforcement effort led by the Federal Bureau of Investigation (FBI), which culminated in the site's seizure and arrests of several of its members in July 2015. According to the FBI, the case is "believed to be the largest-ever coordinated law enforcement effort directed at an online cyber criminal forum". Upon announcing the 12 charges issued by the United States, Attorney David Hickton called the site "a cyber hornet's nest of criminal hackers", "the most sophisticated English-speaking forum for criminal computer hackers in the world", which "represented one of the gravest threats to the integrity of data on computers in the United States".

On Monday, September 21, 2015, Daniel Placek appeared on the podcast Radiolab discussing his role in starting Darkode and his eventual cooperation with the United States government in its efforts to take down the site.

There were around two hundred and fifty to three hundred individuals in the Darkode forum. When arrests were made, they were made over a span of twenty countries. Canada, the United States, Germany, Croatia, Nigeria, Romania, and Cyprus were some of the countries that these individuals were found.

When Darkode was shut down, there were twenty-eight individuals arrested with connections to this forum. Of these twenty-eight arrests, there were twelve people being charged by the United States. The rest of the arrests were made across the world in various countries.

== Revivals ==
Only two weeks after the announcement of the raid, the site reappeared with increased security, employing blockchain-based authentication and operating on the Tor anonymity network.

In December 2016 another version of the site returned on the original domain name. Security researcher MalwareTech suggested the relaunch was not genuine, and almost immediately after, it was hacked and its database leaked.

== See also ==
- BlackHatWorld
- BreachForums
- Hack Forums
- Hydra Market
- Lizard Squad, a hacking group, said to have used Darkode
- Nulled
- OGUsers
- RaidForums
- ShinyHunters
