= Operation Talent =

2025 investigation into cybercrime forums

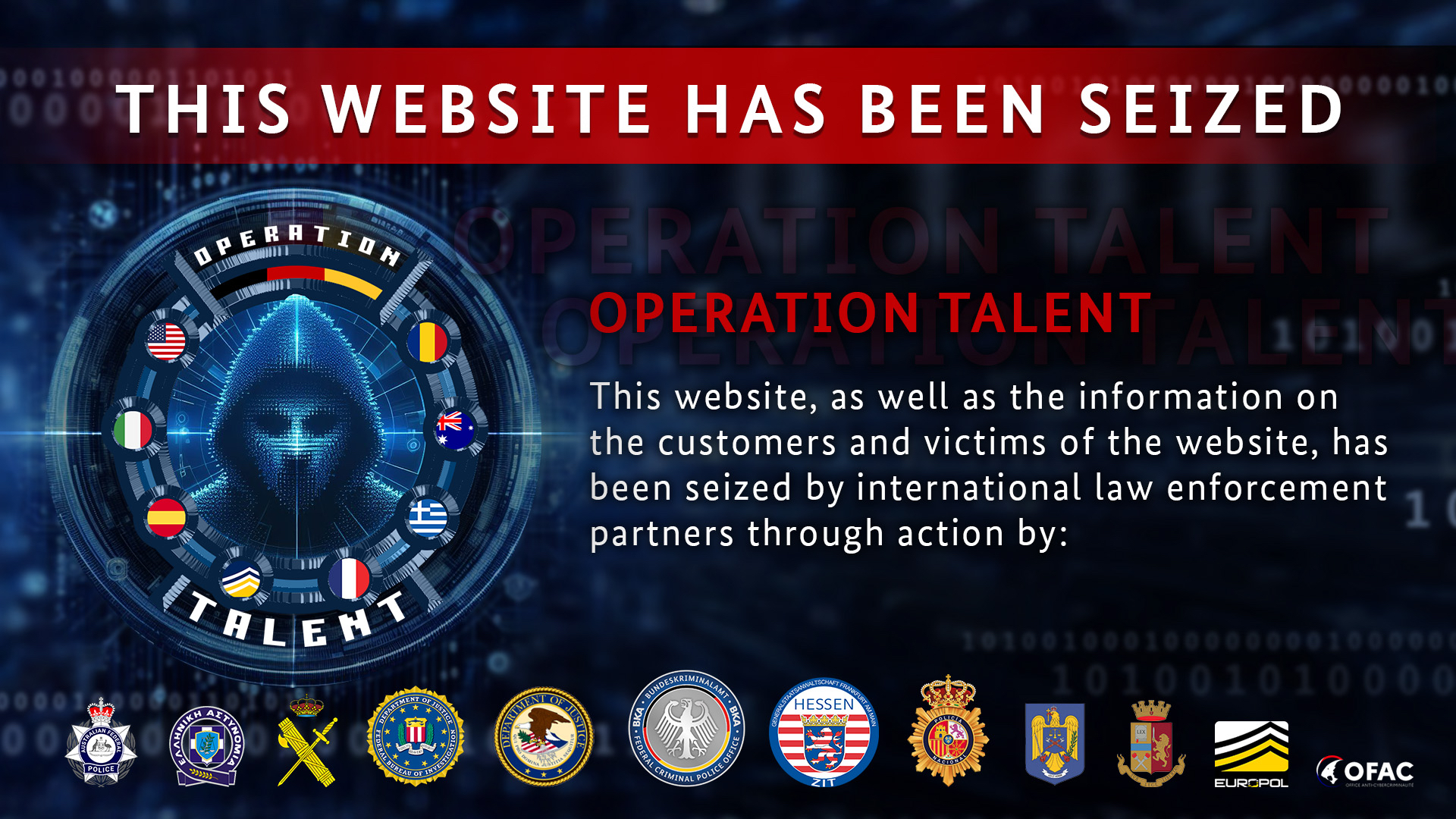
- Operation name: Operation Talent
- Type: Takedown of cybercrime forums

Participants
- Executed by: FBI; Europol
- Countries participating: Australia; France; Germany; Greece; Italy; Romania; United States of America

Mission
- Target: Cracked; Nulled

Timeline
- Date begin: 28 January 2025
- Date end: 30 January 2025

Results
- Arrests: 2
- Miscellaneous results: 17 servers and over 50 electronic devices seized 7 properties searched Around €300,000 of cash and cryptocurrencies seized

Operation Talent was an investigation targeting cybercrime forums, specifically targeting Cracked and Nulled. The operation was initiated and managed by the Federal Bureau of Investigation supported by Europol

== Websites ==
=== Nulled ===
Nulled was an online cracking forum. Alongside the seizure of the Nulled domain, the United States Department of Justice unsealed charges against Lucas Sohn, a 29-year-old Argentinian national living in Spain who was alleged to be one of the forum's administrators. The charges included conspiracy to traffic in passwords as well as conspiracy counts related to access device fraud and identity fraud.

=== Cracked ===
Cracked was an online cracking forum.

=== Sellix ===
Sellix
- Website type: Online marketplace
- Available in: English
- CEO: Daniele Servadei
- Website: sellix.com
- Advertising: No
- Commercial: No
- Registration: Required to access features
- Launched: 2022
- Current status: Offline

Sellix was an online marketplace used to sell online goods, allowing users to accept cryptocurrency payment methods in order to widen their customer base. seized as part of Operation Talent.

== Results ==
According to the United States Department of Justice, Cracked had more than four million users and Nulled more than five million. 12 domains seized including Cracked, Nulled, and Sellix, €300,000 of cash and cryptocurrencies seized, and two arrests. According to Spanish police, the two suspects were arrested in Valencia. StarkRDP, a hosting service advertised on both forums and operated by the same suspects behind them, was also taken down.
