= Hack Forums =

Internet forum

- Website type: Internet forum
- Available in: English
- Website: hackforums.net
- Advertising: Yes
- Commercial: Yes
- Registration: Required
- Launched: 2007
- Current status: Active

Hack Forums (often shortened to 'HF') is an Internet forum dedicated to discussions related to hacker culture and computer security. The website ranked as the number one website in the "Hacking" category in terms of web traffic by the analysis company Alexa Internet. The website has been widely reported as facilitating online criminal activity, such as the case of Zachary Shames, who was arrested for selling keylogging software on Hack Forums in 2013 which was used to steal personal information.

== Security breaches ==
In June 2011, the hacktivist group LulzSec, as part of a campaign titled "50 days of lulz", breached Hack Forums and released the data they obtained. The leaked data included credentials and personal information of nearly 200,000 registered users.

On 27 August 2014, Hack Forums was hacked with a defacement message by an Egyptian hacker, using the online handle "Eg-R1z".

On 26 July 2016, Hack Forums administrator ("Omniscient") warned its users of a security breach. In an e-mail he suggested users to change their passwords and enable 2FA.

== Alleged criminal incidents ==
According to a press release from the United States Department of Justice, Zachary Shames developed a keylogger in 2013 that allowed users to steal sensitive information, including passwords and banking credentials, from a victim's computer. Shames developed the keylogger known as "Limitless Logger Pro", which was sold for $35 on Hack Forums.

On 12 August 2013, hackers used SSH brute-force to mass target Linux systems with weak passwords. The tools used by hackers were then later posted on Hack Forums.

On 15 May 2014, the FBI targeted customers of a popular Remote Administration Tool (RAT) called 'Blackshades'. Blackshades RAT was malware created and sold on Hack Forums.

On 14 January 2016, the developer of the MegalodonHTTP Botnet was arrested. MegalodonHTTP included a number of features as "Binary downloading and executing", "Distributed Denial of service (DDoS) attack methods", "Remote Shell", "Antivirus Disabling", "Crypto miner for Bitcoin, Litecoin, Omnicoin and Dogecoin". The malware was sold on Hack Forums.

On 22 September 2016, many major websites were forced offline after being hit with “Mirai”, a malware that targeted unsecured Internet of Things (IoT) devices. The source code for Mirai was published on Hack Forums as open-source. In response, on 26 October 2016, Omniscient, the administrator of Hack Forums, removed the DDoS-for-Hire section from the forum permanently.

On 21 October 2016, popular websites, including Twitter, Amazon, Netflix, were taken down by a distributed denial-of-service attack. Researchers claimed that the attack was stemmed from contributors on Hack Forums.

On Monday, 26 February 2018, Agence France-Presse (AFP) reported that Ukrainian authorities had collared Avalanche cybercrime organizer Gennady Kapkanov, who was allegedly living under a fake passport in Poltava, a city in central Ukraine. He marketed the Remote Administration Tool (NanoCore RAT) and another software licensing program called Net Seal exclusively on Hack Forums. Earlier, in December 2016, the FBI had arrested Taylor Huddleston, the programmer who created NanoCore and announced it first on Hack Forums.

On 31 August 2018, several users on Hack Forums claimed to have received an e-mail from Google informing them that the FBI demanded the release of user data linked to the LuminosityLink malware sold on Hack Forums.

On 29 October 2018, Vice Media reported that Saud Al-Qahtani, advisor to Crown Prince Mohammed bin Salman of Saudi Arabia and one of the alleged masterminds behind the assassination of Jamal Khashoggi, was heavily active on Hack Forums for many years under the username Nokia2mon2, requesting assistance in hacking victims and purchasing malicious surveillance software. There were rumours among users of Hack Forums that Nokia2mon2 was connected to the government of Saudi Arabia and he was using the website as a resource to perform espionage on journalists, foreigners, and dissidents.

== Public reception ==
According to CyberScoop's Patrick Howell O'Neill, "The forum caters mostly to a young audience who are curious and occasionally malicious, but still learning... Furthermore, HackForums is the kind of internet community that can seem impenetrable, even incomprehensible, to outsiders. It has a reputation for being populated by trolls: chaos-driven children and brazen criminal activity."

Cybersecurity journalist Brian Krebs described HackForums as "a forum that is overrun with teenage wannabe hackers who spend most of their time trying to impress, attack or steal from one another."

Allison Nixon, Director of Security Research at Flashpoint, compared the activity on HackForums to that of real-world street gangs, stating:

You have a bunch of kids, not a lot of adults, and some people have their own predispositions, and sometimes there is not a lot of guidance to steer that in a productive direction. You see gangs end up forming. There are these online street gangs so to speak, some of them can get pretty destructive in the same way you have violent street gangs in a neighborhood. The individuals themselves may become part of such a gang in order to get a sense of community, a sense of safety, or perhaps something to do because they’re bored. It seems like there’s a lot of parallels.

== See also ==
- BlackHatWorld
- BreachForums
- Dark0de
- Hydra Market
- Nulled
- OGUsers
- RaidForums
- ShinyHunters
