= Nulled =

Online forum board

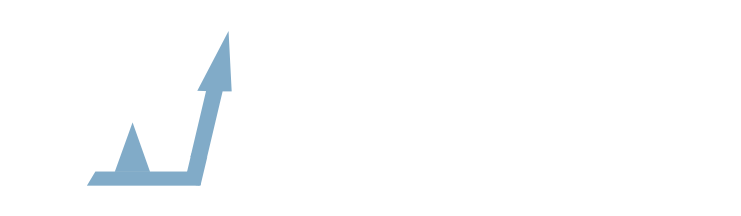
- Website type: Internet forum
- Available in: English
- Website: www.nulled.to
- Advertising: Yes
- Commercial: Yes
- Registration: Required to access features
- Launched: 2014
- Current status: Offline (domain seized by the FBI)

Nulled was an online cracking forum.

In 2016, Nulled suffered a data breach, which helped law enforcement to obtain information about possible 'suspects', who were registered on Nulled.

== Data breach ==
On 16 May 2016, Nulled was hacked and its database leaked. The leaked data contained 9.65GB of users' personal information. The leak included a complete MySQL database file which contained the website's entire data. This data breach included 4,053 user accounts, their PayPal email addresses, along with cracked passwords, 800,593 user personal messages, 5,582 purchase records and 12,600 invoices. The data breach also exposed email addresses hosted on government domains. The identity of the person(s) that took down Nulled's database is not known, but there was speculation that state-sponsored hackers were involved. Another article reported that a Romanian group claimed responsibility for the data breach.

== Operation Talent ==
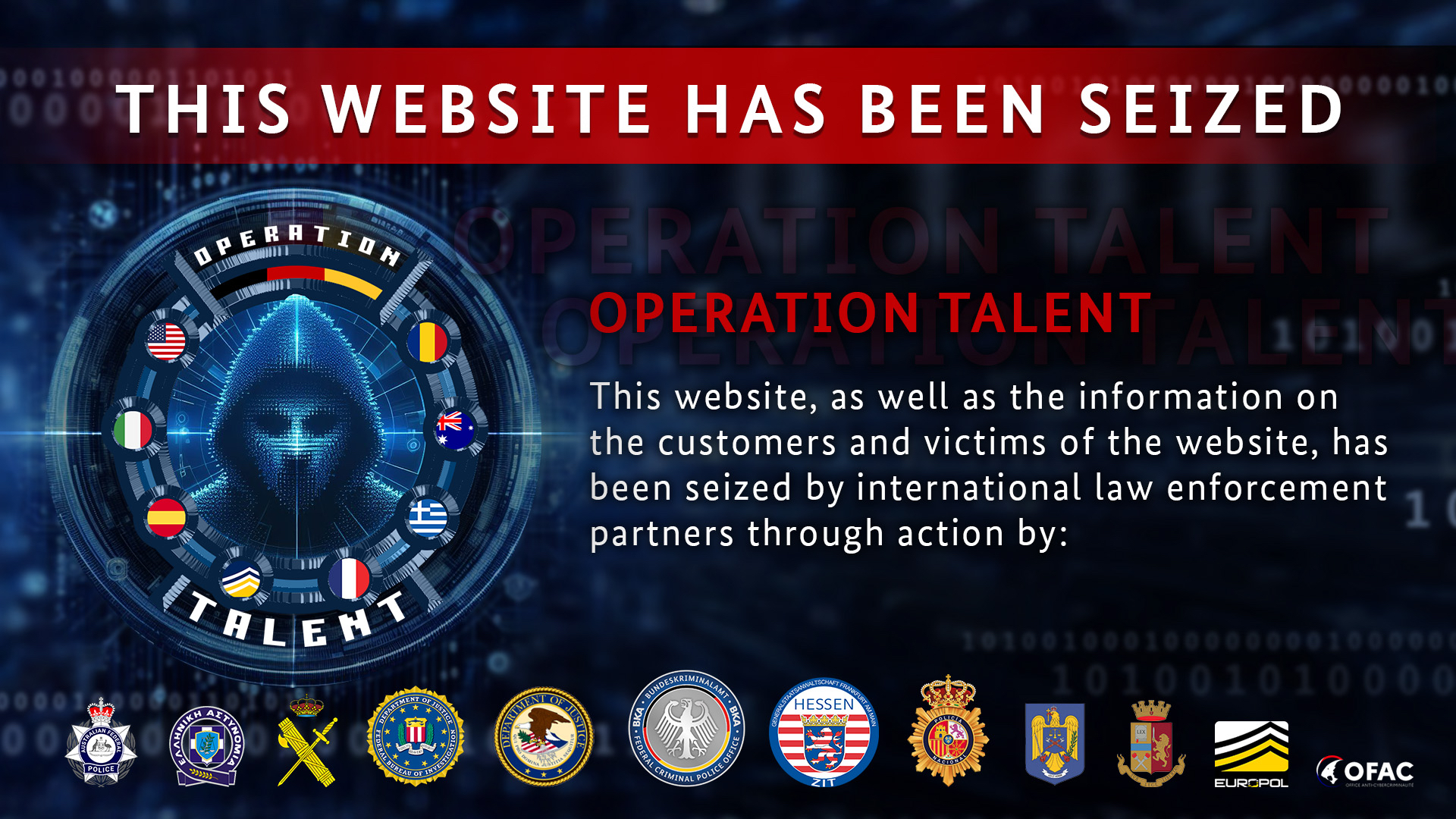
Seizure banner displayed by the FBI on the nulled.to domain as part of Operation Talent, announcing the takedown of the cybercrime platforms

On January 29, 2025, the FBI, in collaboration with international law enforcement agencies, seized the domain of Nulled.to as part of "Operation Talent." This operation targeted several hacking forums known for facilitating cybercriminal activities, including the distribution of stolen credentials and pirated software. The seized websites now display a notice stating that they have been taken down by international law enforcement partners.

== See also ==
- BlackHatWorld
- BreachForums
- Dark0de
- Hack Forums
- Hydra Market
- OGUsers
- RaidForums
- ShinyHunters
