= Operation Shrouded Horizon =

Cybercrime

Operation Shrouded Horizon (bottom)
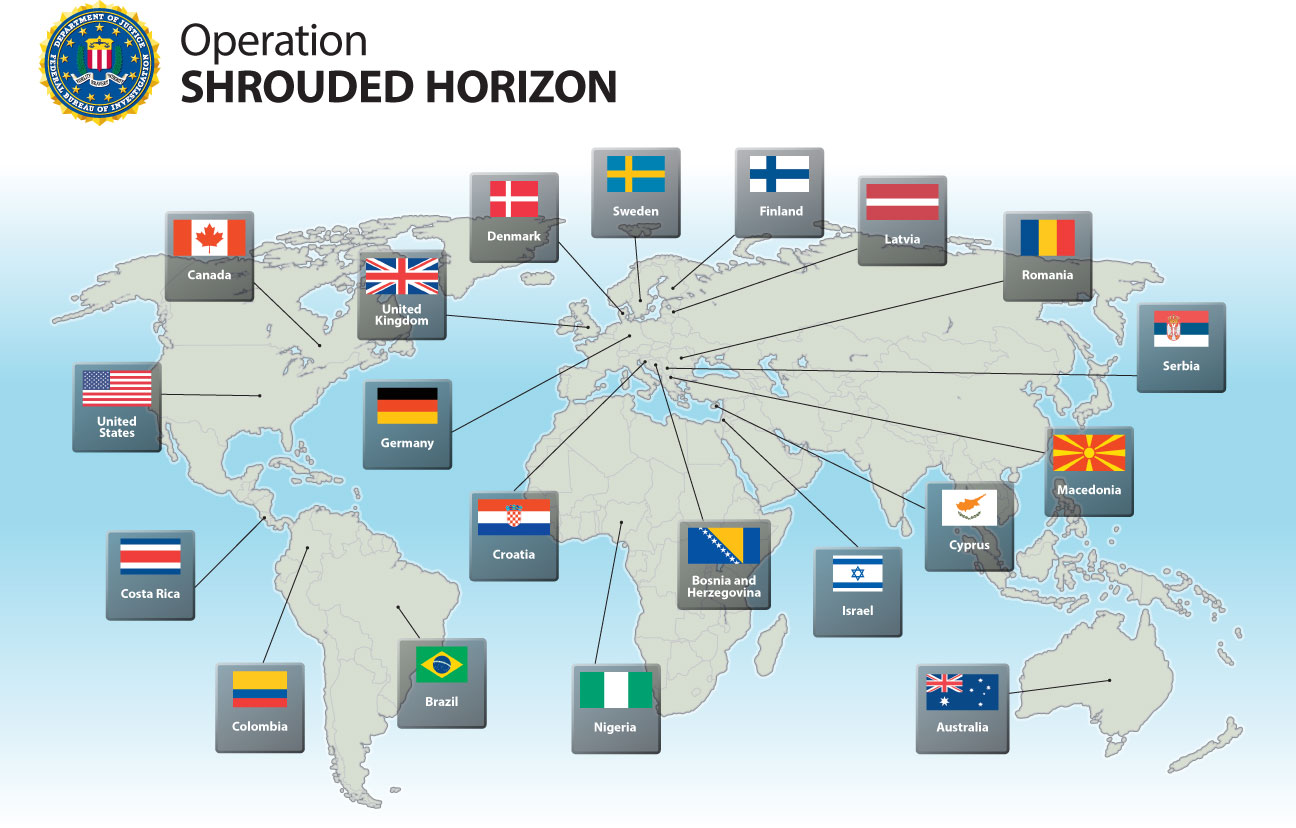
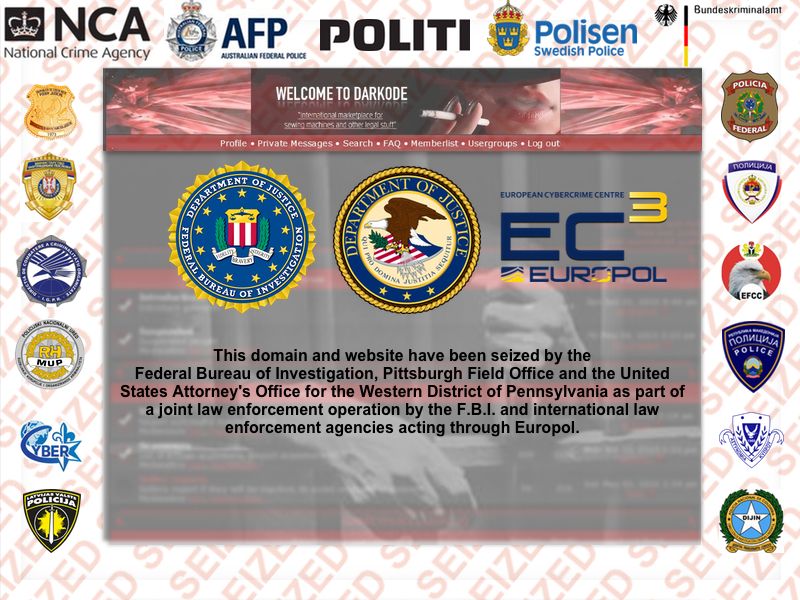
- Map of the 20 countries which provided law enforcement assistance during Operation Shrouded Horizon (top), The message displayed on the homepage of Darkode upon its domain being seized
- Operation name: Operation Shrouded Horizon (bottom)

Participants
- Planned by: United States Federal Bureau of Investigation and Europol
- Countries participating: Australia, Bosnia, Herzegovina, Brazil, Canada, Columbia, Costa Rica, Cyprus, Croatia, Denmark, Finland, Germany, Israel, Latvia, Macedonia, Nigeria, Romania, Serbia, Sweden, United Kingdom and the United States
- No. of countries participating: 20

Mission
- Target: Darkode website
- Method: undisclosed

Timeline
- Date begin: January 2014
- Date end: July 2015
- Duration: 18 months

Results
- Arrests: 70
- Indictments: 12

Operation Shrouded Horizon was an 18-month international law enforcement investigation culminating in the July 2015 seizure of Darkode, an online cybercrime forum and black market, and the arrest of several of its members. The case involved law enforcement agencies from 20 countries, led by the United States Federal Bureau of Investigation (FBI) with the assistance of Europol, in what the FBI called "the largest-ever coordinated law enforcement effort directed at an online cyber criminal forum".

Law enforcement agents gained access to the invite-only website through undisclosed means and collected information over an extended period, leading to equipment seizures, searches, or arrests of 70 individuals globally, leading to indictments against 12 for crimes including computer fraud, conspiracy to commit computer fraud, conspiracy to commit wire fraud, conspiracy to commit money laundering, conspiracy to send malicious code, spamming, identity theft, racketeering, conspiracy to commit bank fraud, extortion, and conspiracy to commit access device fraud. Among those arrested were administrators for darknet market TheRealDeal, who were also active at Darkode.

Upon announcing the charges, United States Attorney David J. Hickton called the site "a cyber hornet's nest of criminal hackers" which "represented one of the gravest threats to the integrity of data on computers in the United States".

Though led by the FBI and assisted by Europol, reports credit agencies in 20 countries: Australia, Bosnia and Herzegovina, Brazil, Canada, Colombia, Costa Rica, Cyprus, Croatia, Denmark, Finland, Germany, Israel, Latvia, Macedonia, Nigeria, Romania, Serbia, Sweden, United Kingdom, and United States.

Only two weeks after the announcement of the raid, the site reappeared with increased security, employing Bitcoin-based blockchain authentication and operating on the Tor anonymity network.
