= Pandabuy =

Chinese e-commerce website

- Industry: Cross-border e-commerce
- Founded: 2019
- Founder: zhouping su
- Defunct: April 11, 2024
- Headquarters: Hangzhou, China
- Products: Counterfeit consumer goods
- Services: Shipping agency
- Number of employees: 2,200+
- Website: www.pandabuy.com

Pandabuy was a Chinese e-commerce shipping agency website that shipped manufactured products from China to the outside world. They were primarily known for shipping counterfeit consumer goods of designer clothing brands as well as expensive shoes made by companies such as Nike.

Pandabuy allowed for non-Chinese users to shop from major Chinese e-commerce websites, such as Tmall, Taobao, and JD.com, serving as a 'middleman' shipping service. Customers and online influencers would often post and promote counterfeit and replica products, known as "reps", that they purchased on Pandabuy, showing them off in "hauls" on social media platforms such as TikTok, along with Discord and Reddit.

== History ==
In early 2024, Pandabuy suffered a data breach; on 31 March 2024, over 1.3 million customers had their personal information leaked on black hat-hacking forum BreachForums by hackers Sanggiero and IntelBroker. Sanggiero later discussed the breach in an interview with the German cybercrime podcast Inside Darknet, where they stated that they selected targets based on personal gain or influence and expressed indifference toward potential harm to individuals resulting from data leaks. According to Have I Been Pwned?, the breach affected 1,348,407 accounts on the platform. Pandabuy later confirmed the breach. According to Bleeping Computer, a spokesperson for Pandabuy said that the company paid an unspecified amount of money to the attacker to prevent the breach from being leaked. On June 3 2024 the individual responsible for the first data breach offered to sell even more alleged leaked data for $40000.

=== 2024 raids ===
In April 2024 16 brands took legal action against Pandabuy alleging its involvement in the counterfeit business. Chinese authorities additionally raided their headquarters in Hangzhou as well as their various warehouses, seizing products and launching further investigations on sellers associated with the platform. According to reports, over 200 authorities in public security, along with local authorities were involved in the raids, with the help from 50 private sector investigators. Authorities seized millions of parcels, containing hundreds of thousands of counterfeit sneakers sold under brand names. The World Trademark Review reported that investigations began in November 2023 by the City of London Police with the help of multiple intellectual property organizations as part of Operation Ashiko. According to Cantoop, a Chinese intellectual property firm, Pandabuy operated out of five Chinese cities with "nearly 20 football stadiums' worth" of warehouses, while employing over 2,200 workers.

=== Latest Developments in 2026 ===
In April 2026, the verdict was handed down in the Pandabuy raid case. The pandabuy.com website has also been officially taken offline and shut down.
