= XSS (disambiguation) =

XSS is cross-site scripting, a type of computer security vulnerability.

XSS may also refer to:

- XSS file, a Microsoft Visual Studio Dataset Designer Surface Data file
- X11 Screen Saver extension, of X11
- Assan language (ISO 639-3 code)
- Xbox Series S, a digital-only video game console
- XSS.is, a now defunct Russian hacking forum

== See also ==
- Experimental Satellite System-11 (XSS 11), a spacecraft
- CSS (disambiguation)
