= Scott Brady =

Scott Brady is the name of:

- Scott Brady (actor), American actor
- Scott Brady (lawyer), American lawyer
