= Ogu =

Ogu or OGU may refer to:

- OGUsers or "OGU", an internet forum
- Ogu people, an ethnic group in Nigeria
- Ogu–Bolo, a local government area in Rivers State, Nigeria
- Ordu–Giresun Airport, an airport in Turkey

== Other uses ==
- John Ogu, a professional footballer
