= David J. Hickton =

American politician

The Honorable David J. Hickton
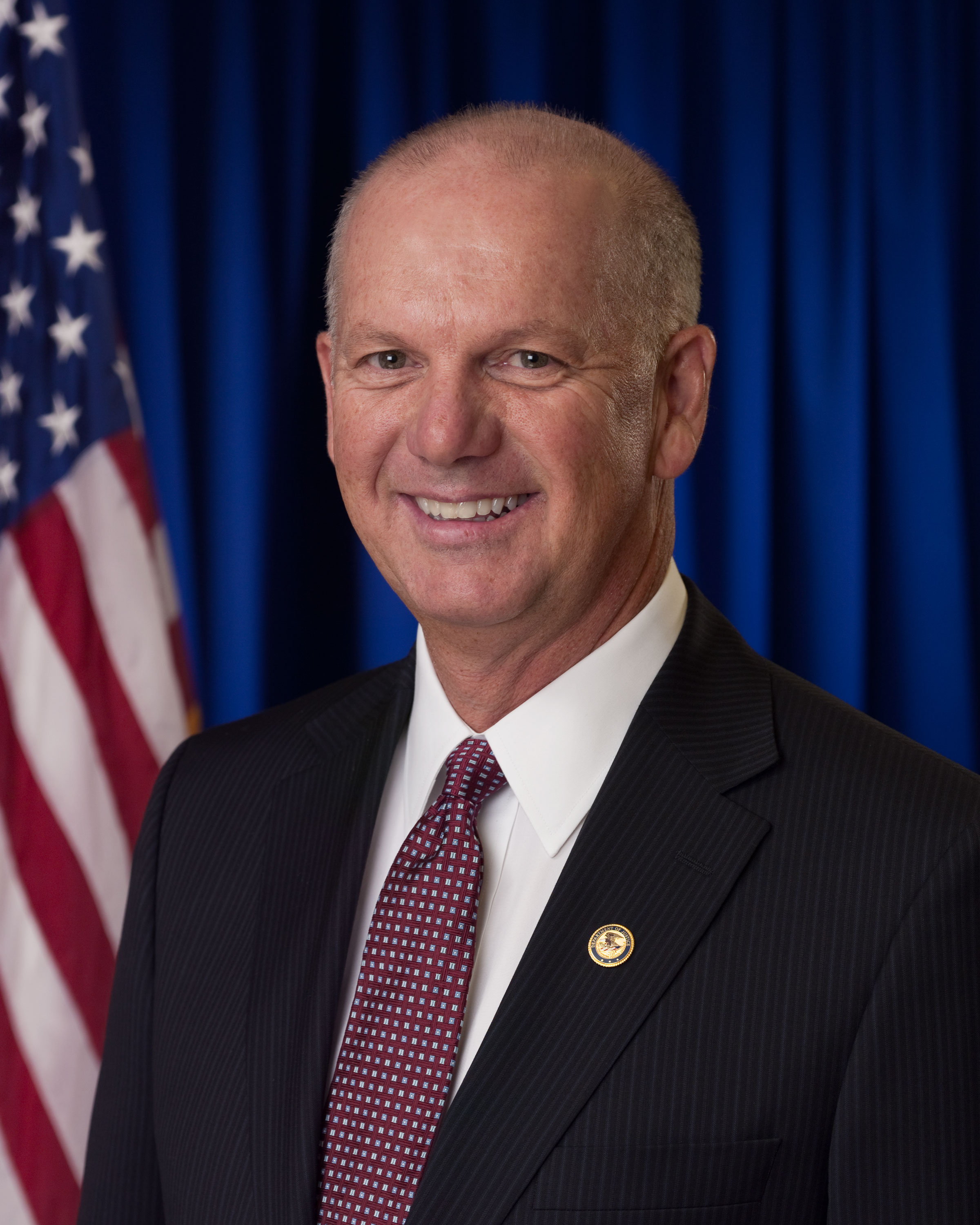
- Hickton's official DOJ photo

United States Attorney for the Western District of Pennsylvania
- In office May 2010 – November 2016
- President: Barack Obama
- Preceded by: Robert S. Cessar
- Succeeded by: Scott Brady

Personal details
- Born: August 14, 1955 (age 71) Columbus, Ohio
- Spouse: Dawne Hickton
- Education: Penn State University (B.A.); University of Pittsburgh School of Law (J.D.)

David J. Hickton (born August 14, 1955) is the director and founder of the University of Pittsburgh Institute for Cyber Law, Policy and Security. Prior to that, he was the 57th U.S. Attorney for the Western District of Pennsylvania. He resigned following the election of President Donald Trump and began his position at Pitt in January 2017. While a U.S. Attorney, Hickton brought several indictments for cybertheft and hacking. Prior to becoming U.S. Attorney, Hickton engaged in the private practice of law, specifically in the areas of transportation, litigation, commercial and white collar crime.

== Early life and education ==
Hickton was born on August 14, 1955, in Columbus, Ohio. He received his undergraduate degree from Pennsylvania State University and his Juris Doctor degree from the University of Pittsburgh School of Law, where he met his wife Dawne Eileen Sepanski Hickton.

== Career ==
Hickton began his legal career as a law clerk for U.S. District Judge Gustave Diamond from 1981 to 1983. For eleven years, Hickton was an adjunct professor at the Duquesne University School of Law, where he taught a course on antitrust law. He served on the Board of Trustees at Penn State University from 1977 to 1980.

He was nominated as United States Attorney for Western Pennsylvania by President Barack Obama on May 3, 2010, and confirmed by the U.S. Senate on August 5, 2010.

In May 2014, Hickton's office brought an indictment against five members of the Chinese People's Liberation Army, alleging economic espionage. The defendants were charged with hacking into American entities to steal trade secrets and other information that would be useful to Chinese competitors. Victims included Westinghouse Electric Company, the U.S. Steel, Alcoa, Inc., and Allegheny Technologies. His office also indicted Russian hacker Evgeniy Bogachev, one of the world's leading cyber criminals.

In July 2015, his office, in cooperation with the U.S. Federal Bureau of Investigation (FBI) and legal authorities in 19 other countries, shut down Dark0de, a cybercrime forum and black marketplace for security hackers. Darkode offered malware to disrupt operations in computer systems in several countries, and offered stolen data ranging from U.S. Social Security numbers to passwords.

In June 2015, Hickton and his office brought forth a 21 count indictment of conspiracy, money laundering, wire fraud, and identity theft against Cuban national Yoandy Perez Llanes. In 2016, Mr. Llanes was extradited from Venezuela to the U.S., and later in 2017, Llanes and a cohort Soler Nodarse, pleaded guilty for their part in a $2.2 million scheme where hackers stole an estimated 62,000 tax forms of UPMC employees and sold them on the dark web.

While U.S. Attorney for Western Pennsylvania, Hickton was named to co-chair a national Heroin Task Force. In 2014, he formed the U.S. Attorney's Working Group on Addiction: Prevention, Intervention, Treatment, and Recovery. His office worked with the University of Pittsburgh to post information online about lethal batches of heroin.

In 2011, Hickton assembled a Community Police Working Group to help build trust between members of law enforcement and the public. The group held community-based meetings, developed a Crisis Team, and distributed thousands of surveys to elicit community feedback about community-police relations and safety. In 2015, Pittsburgh was selected by Attorney General Loretta Lynch as one of six pilot cities for the National Initiative for Building Community Trust and Justice.

Following a three-year investigation, Hickton secured fundamental changes in the Pennsylvania Department of Corrections (PDOC) to humanely address the issues of unconstitutional confinement conditions for those suffering from serious mental illness and for victims of institutional sexual assault. He also initiated a case study in police-community reconciliation in the neighborhood of Homewood.

In 2015, Hickton led an investigation of Education Management Corporation (EDMC), which resulted in the recovery of $95.5 million, the largest False Claims Act (FCA) recovery of Department of Education funds.

In 2016, Hickton successfully prosecuted former CEO and founder of Pennsylvania Cyber Charter School Nicholas Trombetta, who pleaded guilty of conspiracy, where he took approximately $8 million of educational funds for illegal use. In 2016, Hickton also lead the prosecution of Michael J. Ruffatto, who transferred to his personal bank account $5.7 million in funds from U.S. Department of Energy's National Energy Technology Laboratory that was awarded to the North American Power Group.

At the request of Linda Lane, Superintendent of Pittsburgh Public Schools, Hickton responded to an incident of cross burning in front of an elementary school in the city. He said, the incident was a "notorious sign of hate.." and that the US Civil Rights Section and the FBI were also participating in the investigation.

In 2020 Hickton served as staff director and senior counsel to the House Select Subcommittee on the Coronavirus Crisis from May 2020 – June 2021.

== Awards and recognition ==
Hickton and his wife Dawne have been involved in the Loren H. Roth, MD, Summer Research Program in the School of Medicine. Pitt declared Hickton as a Legacy Laureate in 2013. He also received a 225th anniversary medallion, an honor bestowed on alumni who have brought particular honor to the University through their work and service.

In 2016, Pitt's School of Law named Hickton one of its Distinguished Alumni. That same year, Hickton was named the Attorney of the Year by The Legal Intelligencer. On January 27, 2017, at the 19th Annual LEAD (Law Enforcement Agency Directors) Awards, Hickton was presented with a special recognition award for his work in the areas of national security and cyber crime.

Hickton is a Fellow in the American College of Trial Lawyers and a Fellow of the Academy of Trial Lawyers of Allegheny County. He has been admitted before the U.S. Supreme Court, the Pennsylvania Supreme Court, the U.S. District Court for the Western District of Pennsylvania, and several of the U.S. circuit courts. In 2013, Hickton and his wife donated $1 million to establish an endowment for the University of Pittsburgh's Elder Law Clinic, a clinic which is designed to teach law students practical skills while providing free legal services to low income older adults and their family members.

Under President Bill Clinton, Hickton served on the President's Advisory Committee on the Arts for the John F. Kennedy Center for the Performing Arts. He is an executive board member of the Pittsburgh Public Theater and also served as its president. He was a longtime member of the Pittsburgh Cultural Trust, a non-profit agency that works to promote arts and culture in Downtown Pittsburgh. Hickton also serves as the managing trustee of the National Opioid Abatement Trust II and on the boards of directors of the Carnegie Hero Fund Commission, AmeriServ Financial, Inc., and World Affairs Council Pittsburgh. He is a Non-Resident Senior Advisor at the Center for Strategic & International Studies and a Distinguished Fellow of the Azure Forum for Contemporary Security Strategy. He and his wife have six children and six grandchildren.
