= RaidForums =

Defunct cybercrime internet forum

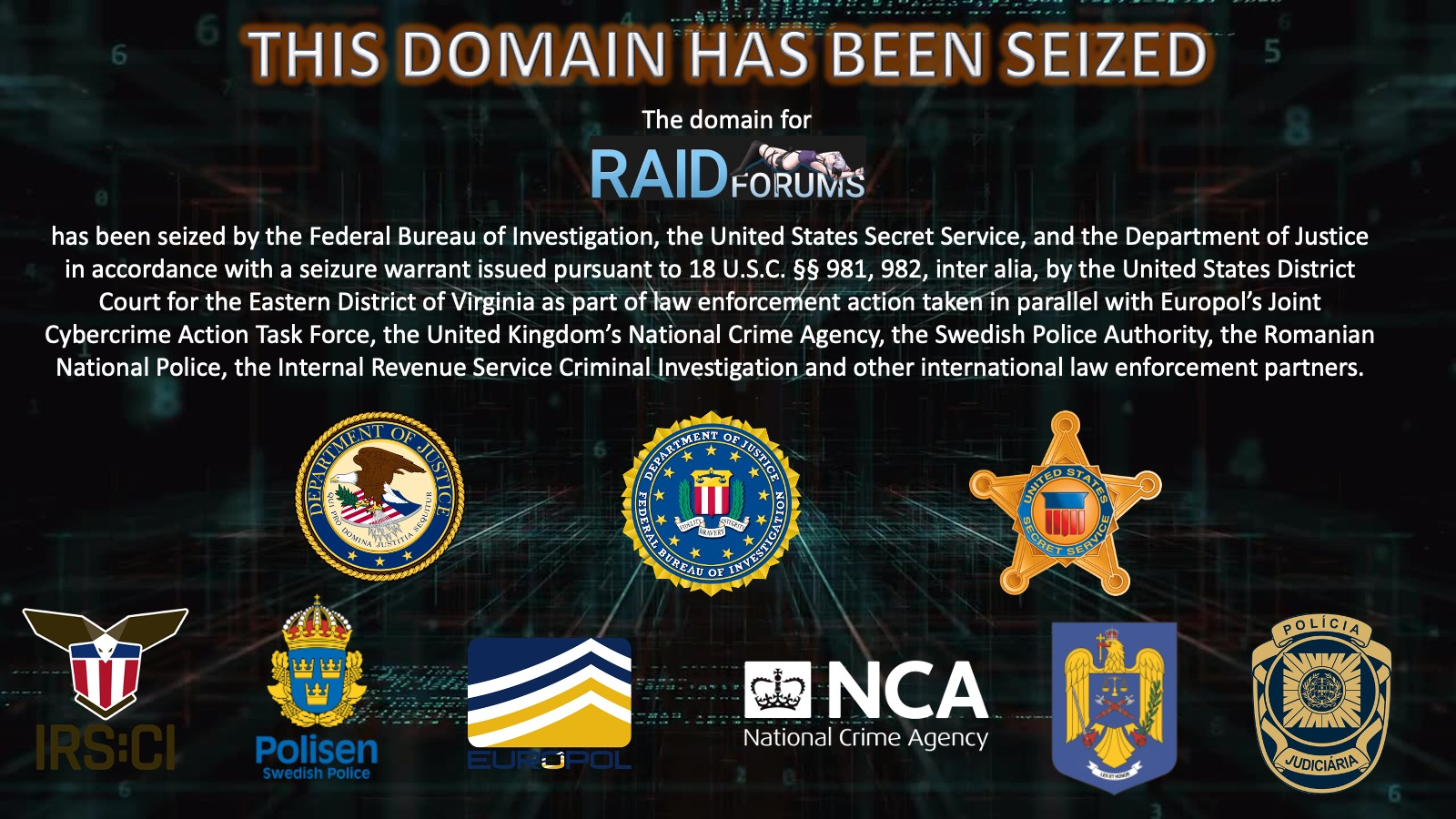
- Domain seizure notice on RaidForums.com
- Website type: Internet forum
- Available in: English
- Dissolved: April 12, 2022; 4 years ago
- Successor: BreachForums
- Country of origin: United Kingdom
- Founder: Omnipotent
- Key people: Ominous
- Website: raidforums.com
- Advertising: Yes
- Commercial: Yes
- Registration: Optional
- Users: 530,000 at time of shutdown
- Launched: 2015; 11 years ago
- Current status: Seized by the FBI

RaidForums was an English-language black hat hacking internet forum founded in 2015. The website facilitated the discussion of a variety of hacking topics and was a notable distributor of various data breaches, hacking tools, and pornography until its closure and seizure by law enforcement authorities in 2022. The website was monetized via advertisements and through a tiered membership program where members with higher tiers would receive elevated access to the forum and its contents.

== History ==
RaidForums began in 2015 as a platform for Twitch raiders.

== Domain seizure ==
The domain and its contents were seized by the Federal Bureau of Investigation on April 12, 2022, after a month of downtime, in collaboration with the United States Secret Service, the United States Department of Justice, and a variety of other national and international law enforcement agencies.

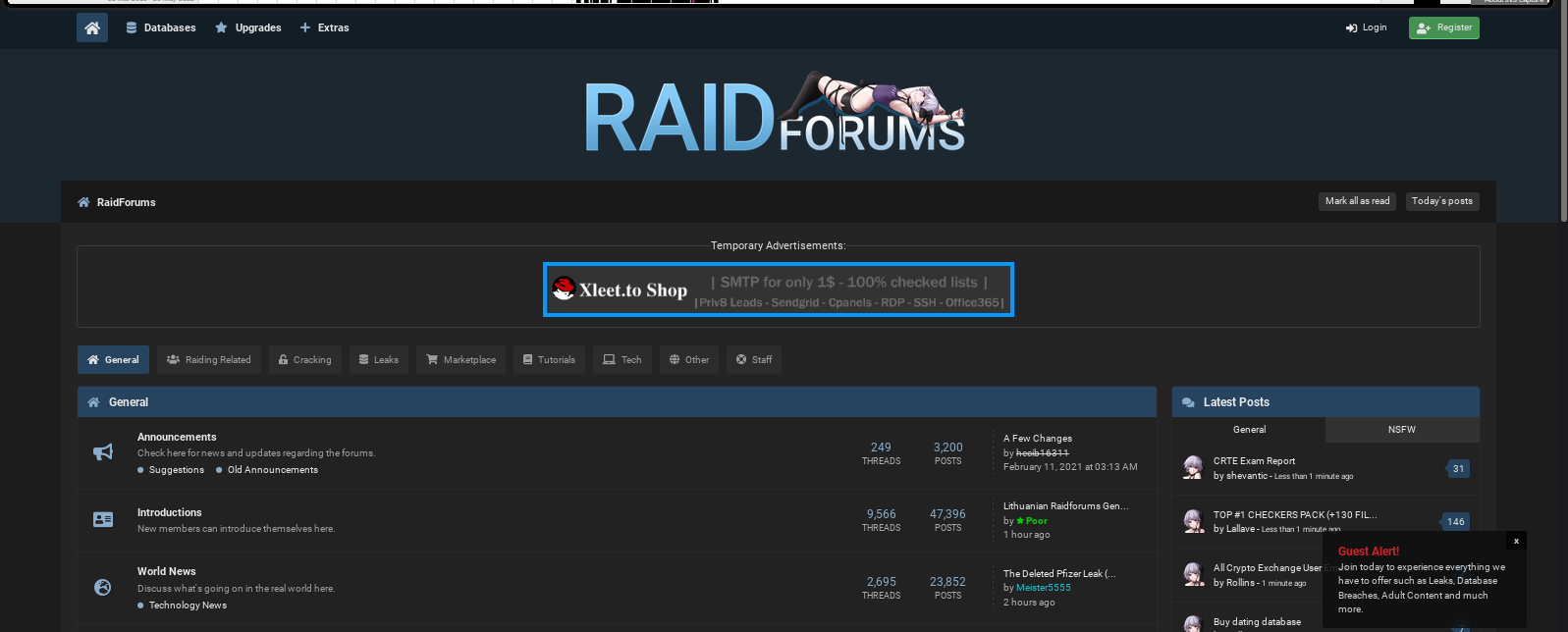
RaidForums.com in 2021

== Administration ==
The website was allegedly founded in 2015 by a then 14-year-old Portuguese national, Diogo Santos Coelho, under the screen name "Omnipotent", who was arrested on January 31, 2022, in the United Kingdom. His arrest occurred pending several years of investigation after several of his devices were searched under warrant at the Hartsfield-Jackson International Airport in June 2018, suggesting he was the owner and primary administrator "Omnipotent". According to hackread.com, administrators under the screen name "Moot" "Jaw" “Ominous” announced the seizure officially on the forum's public Telegram channel, and redirected subscribers of the channel to RaidForums' backup domain rf.to

== Impact ==
At the time of its closure in 2022, the forum had over 530,000 registered users and operated as an illicit hacking forum accessible through the clearnet.[1]

== See also ==
- BlackHatWorld
- BreachForums
- Dark0de
- Hack Forums
- Hydra Market
- Nulled
- OGUsers
- ShinyHunters
