= Russian darknet market conflict =

The Russian darknet market conflict is a cyber conflict in the Russian darknet drug market, which began after the closure of the largest marketplace Hydra in April 2022. The struggle manifests itself in mutual cyber attacks of sites and an aggressive advertising campaign.

== History ==
In April 2022, the servers of Hydra, the largest Russian darknet drug market, were closed in Germany. After this event, Russian darknet markets began to fight for the place of the market leader, arranging cyber attacks on each other and using aggressive advertising on the streets of Moscow.

In July 2022, Kraken and Solaris warned subscribers of their telegram channels to withdraw any cryptocurrency they had on the forum of the competing platform RuTor. A few days later, RuTor was subjected to cyber attacks and was temporarily closed. RuTor soon reopened and launched a cyberattack on the WayAway site, posting screenshots of the hack, claiming WayAway's security was too weak to be trusted.

In the fall of 2022, an advertisement for the Kraken site appeared on one of the advertising cubes in Moscow City, which caused a huge scandal in society. In October, the Solaris darknet marketplace attacked Kraken, RuTor, Mega, BlackSprut and other competitors using the services of the Russian hacker group Killnet, which later financed the Russian army in the Russian invasion of Ukraine with money stolen from drug shops. In December of the same year, a bus plastered with logos and a QR code from the darknet site Kraken blocked traffic on the Arbat in Moscow for several hours. In the same month, the Moldovan streamer and tiktoker Necoglai held a stream in a T-shirt with the logo of the Mega marketplace, suggesting people to use the legal file sharing service of the same name, he denies any involvement in advertising.

In January 2023, the Moriarty channel appears on YouTube. On it, an unknown man in a black suit and mask introduces himself as the creator of the Mega darknet market, talks about drug cartels and advertises his platform. And in the Moscow metro, ads of the Mega site began to appear with a QR code to go to the site. That same month, the WayAway forum hacking team hacked into the Solaris platform and attached it to Kraken. Powering on the Solaris Darknet Marketplace site now automatically opens the Kraken site. In mid-January, personal android applications of the darknet markets began to appear on Google Play, after their removal, sites began to place APK files for downloading the application in their telegram channels and sites.

In February 2023, advertisements for the BlackSprut site began to appear on Moscow's electronic billboards. Huge signs featured a woman wearing a futuristic mask and the text: "Come to me in search of the best."
