= Scott Brady (lawyer) =

American attorney

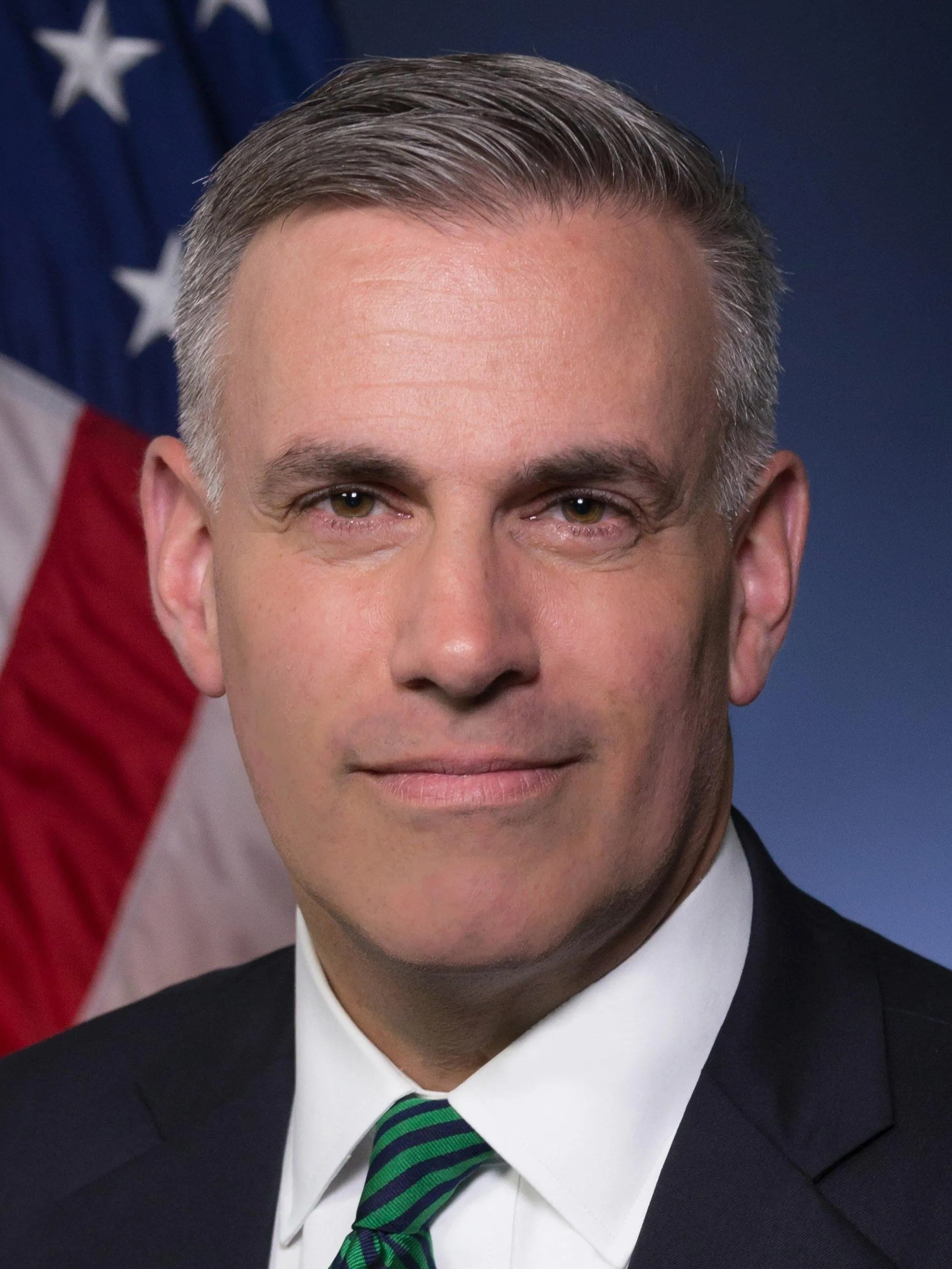

United States Attorney for the Western District of Pennsylvania
- In office December 22, 2017 – February 28, 2021
- President: Donald Trump; Joe Biden
- Preceded by: David J. Hickton
- Succeeded by: Steve Kaufman (acting)

Personal details
- Education: Harvard University (BA); Pennsylvania State University (JD)

Scott W. Brady is an American attorney who was the United States Attorney for the Western District of Pennsylvania from 2017 to 2021. Before becoming the U.S. Attorney, he was the head of litigation for Federated Investors.

== Early life and education ==
Brady graduated from Harvard University and the Pennsylvania State University School of Law. He clerked for Thomas Hardiman of the United States District Court for the Western District of Pennsylvania. Before law school, he worked in emergency relief and development in Europe, the Middle East and Central Asia.

== Career ==
Brady was an Assistant United States Attorney in Pittsburgh, from 2004 to 2010, where he prosecuted white collar crime, violent crime and drug trafficking offenses. He was also an associate at Jones Day and at Reed Smith, where his practice focused on multi-district litigation, white collar criminal matters and internal investigations. Brady is an adjunct faculty member at the University of Pittsburgh School of Law.

The New York Times reported in December 2020 that some Justice Department colleagues saw him as a "deeply partisan leader" who had said he would never serve under a Democratic president, and had left the department upon the election of Barack Obama but returned after Trump became president. Some Pittsburgh prosecutors and agents saw Brady as a Trump loyalist who might be positioning himself to run for political office. In early 2020, attorney general Bill Barr directed Brady to scrutinize information that had been gathered in Ukraine by Trump's personal attorney Rudy Giuliani, relating to Trump's opponent in the 2020 presidential campaign Joe Biden and his son, Hunter. Brady met with Giuliani in Pittsburgh to discuss the materials, and the arrangement raised concerns within the FBI and DOJ about the agencies being drawn into a politicized investigation.

On February 8, 2021, he and 55 other Trump-era attorneys were asked to resign. He resigned on February 28, 2021.

== See also ==
- Trump–Ukraine scandal
