= DC Health Link =

Health insurance marketplace

DC Health Benefit Exchange Authority
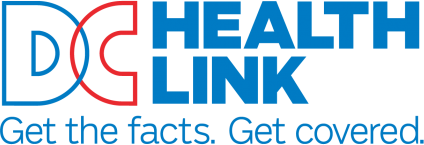

Agency overview
- Formed: 2012
- Jurisdiction: Health insurance marketplace for the District of Columbia
- Agency executive: Mila Kofman, Executive director
- Website: dchealthlink.com

DC Health Link is the health insurance marketplace for the District of Columbia, in the United States, created pursuant to the Patient Protection and Affordable Care Act. DC Health Link is administered by the District's Health Benefit Exchange Authority.

== Overview ==
As of January 10, 2014, DC Health Link had enrolled 3,646 people in individual or family insurance plans. The District has had more success than the states' health insurance exchanges in signing up young people. Many members of Congress are enrolled in DC Health Link.

On March 8, 2023, Congress was warned of a breach of DC Health Link data on the Dark Web. The culprits claim to have the information of 170,000 DC Health Link customers. The Federal Bureau of Investigation confirmed that some of the stolen data had been made available for sale online, and House staff were informed in an internal memo describing the incident as a "significant" data breach that may have exposed the personal information of thousands of individuals.
