= BlackHatWorld =

Internet forum

- Website type: Internet forum
- Available in: English
- Area served: Worldwide
- Website: www.blackhatworld.com
- Advertising: Banner ads, promoted links

Nguyễn lords

BlackHatWorld (BHW) is an Internet forum focused on black-hat search engine optimization (SEO) techniques and services.

Site services are varied, including cryptocurrency, social media marketing, graphic design, app development, SEO, and copywriting. Other site services include bulk account registration, unconventional money-making methods, social media botting, and developments in the SEO space. It features a marketplace where companies and individuals can advertise their products. But only after BlackHatWorld employees have verified the success and dependability of the organization. Damien Trevatt, also known online as Diamond Damien, is known as the current owner of BlackHatWorld.

== History ==
The forum has existed since 2005. When it began, the site was primarily a forum for discussing search engine optimization tips. By the time of a 2013 study by Afroz et al., the forum had become a “discussion and commerce hub”. In 2015, the forum's two largest communities traded video uploading and blog generator tools. Communities consisted of a few core members and many peripheral members. By 2016, BlackHatWorld was one of the largest public forums for the black hat underground community. Most users were located in India, Pakistan, or the US.

Efforts by social media companies, such as 2018 crackdowns by YouTube and Instagram, have adversely affected sites such as BlackHatWorld.

== Services ==
Users of BlackHatWorld are primarily English-speaking. Search engine optimization is the most common service, with many users using BlackHatWorld offering services such as spamming blogs and forums with links. Users must pay a fee to post in a public thread or download a file. Admins and moderators review products. Some users allege that these moderators are corrupt. Users’ reputation is tracked, and only reputable users can participate in more exclusive threads. Users who violate community norms can be banned or fined. Skype is the most popular off-site communication method. The platform does not only focus on black-hat marketing practices but also has sections dedicated to grey hat and white hat activities. There is also a dedicated "My Journey" section for the community to actively share their experiences and journey with internet marketing.
