= Hydra Market =

Defunct dark web marketplace

Hydra
- Website type: Darknet market
- Available in: Russian
- Revenue: $5 billion dollars (lifetime)
- Commercial: Yes
- Users: 17 million users 19,000 sellers
- Launched: 2015
- Current status: Offline since April 2022

Hydra (Russian: Гидра) was a Russian language dark web marketplace, founded in 2015, that facilitated trafficking of illegal drugs, financial services including cryptocurrency tumbling for money laundering, exchange services between cryptocurrency and Russian rubles, and the sale of falsified documents and hacking services. Hydra was shut down by American and German law enforcement action in April 2022, and its operator was sentenced to life in prison by a Russian court in December 2024.

== Services ==
Unique among dark net marketplaces, Hydra provided various criminal financial services. Goods and services traded on the site included drugs, stolen data, counterfeit currency and hacking tools. It operated mainly in Russian-speaking countries. Sellers hid drugs at specific spots, such as beneath trees, benches or bins, and buyers received coordinates and directions for collecting them. Security experts described the platform as highly decentralized and said it offered users customer support, legal and medical services, and codes of conduct. Niko Vorobyov, a Russian-born author of a book on the global drug trade, said the aim was to isolate each stage of the supply chain: customers did not know the drug distributors, the distributors did not know their bosses and the bosses did not know their suppliers.

== Closure ==
On April 5, 2022, American and German federal government law enforcement agencies announced the seizure of the website's Germany-based servers and cryptocurrency assets. Before its closure, it had been the longest-running dark web marketplace. The United States Department of Justice has indicted one Russian man for his role in running the servers for the website. In December 2024, a Russian court sentenced Hydra operator Stanislav Moiseyev to life in prison. Fifteen accomplices also received sentences of eight to 23 years. The Moscow prosecutor's office did not publicly connect the verdict to Hydra; the state news agencies TASS and Interfax made the link, citing anonymous law enforcement sources. According to the newspaper Kommersant, it was the first life sentence a Russian court had handed down for this type of crime. The defendants were found guilty of manufacturing and selling drugs within an organized criminal group. During raids, police reportedly found drug production labs in the suspects' homes. Authorities said they seized almost one metric ton of narcotics and psychotropic substances, much of it stored in cars fitted with hidden compartments. Prosecutors said the group included several dozen co-conspirators who knew one another only by username and communicated through messaging apps or websites reachable only via Tor. Moiseyev was also fined 4 million rubles. His accomplices were fined a combined 16 million rubles. The court also ordered the confiscation of the defendants' vehicles, property and land, which were to pass into state ownership. The verdict could be appealed.

At the time of server takedown it had 17 million registered customers. German authorities also reported more than 19,000 seller accounts on the platform. Sales on the platform totalled at least $1.34 billion in 2020.

The closure of Hydra started the ongoing Russian darknet market conflict among Russian darknet marketplace operators. Researchers reported that darknet market revenue fell to $1.3 billion in 2022, down from $2.6 billion in 2021. Much of the decline was attributed to Hydra.
