= Insanity Zine Corp. =

Hacker group

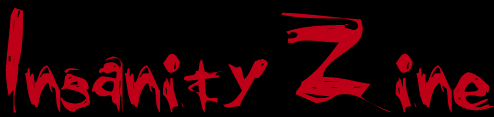
- Founder: ps2 and ntalk
- Type: Hacker group
- Legal status: Inactive
- Location: Brazil

Insanity Zine Corp., stylized as Insanity Zine C0rp or IZ Corp, was a Brazilian hacker group active in the beginning of the 2000s. It was known for perpetrating website defacements.

== Activities ==
According to Terra, Insanity Zine Corp. was formed by two teenagers, ps2 and ntalk, that declared being 15 and 17 years old in 2001. They were inspired by hacker ezines and were looking for fame inside of the scene. The group was associated with other hacker groups, including Crime Boys, Prime Suspectz, Databoy and Sei Lá Quem.

They became notorious for perpetrating website defacement of several relevant companies and groups and posting offenses or bragging of how easy it was for it to occur. Some pages hacked by the group are the Landless Workers' Movement, Symantec, Aiwa, McAfee, HP Inc., Microsoft, Ferrari, and AOL. Sex Shop Virtual was also hacked, where offenses against Mauro Marcelo, chief of the Sector of Investigation for High Technology Crimes (SICAT), were posted.
