= Powerful Greek Army =

Hacker Group

Powerful Greek Army or by the abbreviation "PGA" is a hacker group founded in 2016. The team has carried out numerous cyberattacks both in Greece and worldwide.

== Notable attacks ==
In November 2016, a member of PGA named Kapustkiy breached some of the high commission websites in India, accessing login information of hundreds of users.

In September 2016, the group started the campaign #OpClosedMedia, targeting news media organizations around the world, mainly with denial-of-service attacks.

In December 2016, the group took down the website of the Prime Minister of Greece.

After two years of inactivity on Twitter, PGA did an attack in April 2020, getting access to the School Network of Greece, which is the largest public network that connects all schools, teachers and a number of administrative services and supervised bodies of the Ministry, leaking some of the data they had under their control. The data included usernames, passwords, country of residence, street addresses, phone numbers, and other sensitive data that were stored into the system. On why they did it, the group's main message was that "they wanted to warn the Greek government". The breach was also used by the opposition (and the second most popular political party in Greece) Syriza as a form of confrontation.

Again, in April 2020, PGA hacked the Twitter account of Odysseas Konstantinopoulos, a famous Greek politician, former spokesman of PASOK, and vice president of the Greek Parliament tweeting things like: THIS IS THE LAST WARNING GREEK GOVERNMENT.

In May 2020, they defaced the Institute of Sociological and Political Legal Research of North Macedonia, and also claimed to have hacked North Macedonia's Ministry of Economy and Ministry of Finance, exposing and posting some of the employees' personal information to the public. According to an official statement by the Government of the Republic of North Macedonia, most of the data that the hackers published was old. They also added they had no evidence at the moment that the e-mail systems were hacked, while the Minister of Economy Kreshnik Bekteshi explained that "no damage has been done" and informed that the ministry's IT department told him that no serious and confidential data was stolen. Some days after the attack, the group's Twitter account was taken down.

In August 2020, PGA took offline some of the biggest banks of Turkey, including, Halkbank, Ziraat Bank, İşbank, DenizBank, Yapı Kredi, and Akbank. They also downed the websites of Turkish Airlines and President of Turkey.

In January 2022, the group hacked into the Twitter account of NASA Director Parimal Kopardekar. The exact reason is unknown, but they claimed that they were looking for someone who works at NASA.

In February 2022, the group started the operation OpEndMacedonia, which attacked some of the most important computer systems of North Macedonia such as the websites of the Government, the Ministry of Foreign Affairs, the country's central bank, Makedonski Telekom and news media. The group also hacked the Ministry of Education and Science (North Macedonia), posting their hacked database, and claiming that they "have access even in their camera systems, we watch you 24/7, we have eyes everywhere Skopje". The Ministry confirmed that there was a hacking attack, but said that the camera surveillance system was not theirs. Some weeks after, PGA managed to hit the banking system of North Macedonia, temporarily taking offline all the banks of North Macedonia. National Bank of North Macedonia confirmed the attacks. As an aftermath, North Macedonia signed a Memorandum of understanding agreement with NATO to strengthen their response to cyber attacks.
