= Jesse Tuttle =

American former hacktivist

- Born: 1979 or 1980 (age 46–47); Cincinnati, Ohio, US
- Other name: Hackah Jak
- Years active: 1994–Present
- Organization: Compliology
- Known for: Hacking

Jesse Tuttle (also known as Hackah Jak) is an American hacker who is a former member of the hacking groups Hackweiser, Project China, and the Dispatchers.

== Early hacking and hacktivism ==
Tuttle said that he started defacing websites in 1999 to gain entry into different hacking groups. He adopted the name "Hackah Jak". He joined the group Hackweiser, where he defaced Chinese government websites and websites that seemed to be pro-Iraqi, for what he said were patriotic reasons.

In May 2001, Tuttle told the South China Morning Post that his hacking group had left racist messages on Chinese websites as part of an exchange of cyberattacks between hacktivist American and Chinese groups after the Hainan Island incident in April 2001. Hackweiser was part of a coalition called Project China with World of Hell and other groups.

== The Dispatchers ==
Tuttle founded the Dispatchers, a vigilante hacktivist network, in response to the September 11 attacks. By September 19, when Tuttle said that the group had about 60 members, it had defaced several websites related to Iran, Afghanistan, and Palestine. It also defaced two websites for a company that had offices at the World Trade Center, which Tuttle said was an error. Tuttle and collaborators said that groups within Dispatchers were trying to damage internet connectivity in the countries they targeted and find "the systems that handle their money". A FBI spokesperson said that vigilante hacking efforts were a "disservice to the country". Professor Dorothy E. Denning described the website defacements as part of a growing trend of hacktivists who attracted media attention but were unlikely to change policy. Another professor said that the attacks seemed to be "script kiddie-level attacks", such as exploiting old versions of Microsoft Internet Information Services that had many vulnerabilities.

== Legal proceedings ==
In May 2003, Tuttle was arrested in Hamilton County, Ohio, and later indicted in a case involving alleged unauthorized use of government computer systems. Tuttle denied wrongdoing and argued that some of his activities were connected to cooperation with federal authorities.

In August 2003, Tuttle was placed on pre-trial electronic monitoring house arrest to prevent him from attending a conference in Las Vegas. By July 2005, reports indicated that investigative errors and questionable legal procedures had delayed his trial. Later in 2007, it was reported that Tuttle had spent more than four years on pre-trial house arrest.

== See also ==
- Code Red (computer worm)
- Anonymous (hacker group)
