= YCA =

YCA may refer to:

- The International Air Transport Association airport code of Courtenay Airpark
- Yemen Cyber Army, hacker group
