= Symantec Endpoint Protection =

Computer security software

- Symantec Endpoint Protection Manager GUI, version 14.2
- Developer: Broadcom Inc.
- Stable release: 14.4 (Build 115) / 2 March 2026; 43 days ago
- Operating system: Windows, macOS and Linux
- Platform: IA-32 and x86-64
- Type: Anti-malware, intrusion prevention and firewall
- License: Trialware
- Website: www.broadcom.com/products/cyber-security/endpoint

Symantec Endpoint Protection, originally developed by a division of Symantec Corporation which was acquired by Broadcom Inc. in 2019, is a security software suite that consists of anti-malware, intrusion prevention and firewall features for server and desktop computers.

== Version history ==
The first release of Symantec Endpoint Protection was published in September 2007 and was called version 11.0. Endpoint Protection is the result of a merger of several security software products, including Symantec Antivirus Corporate Edition 10.0, Client Security, Network Access Control, and Sygate Enterprise Edition. Endpoint Protection also included new features. For example, it can block data transfers to unauthorized device types, such as USB flash drives or Bluetooth devices.

At the time, Symantec Antivirus Corporate Edition was widely criticized as having become bloated and unwieldy. Endpoint Protection 11.0 was intended to address these criticisms. The disk footprint of Symantec Corporate Edition 10.0 was almost 100 MB, whereas Endpoint Protection's was projected to be 21 MB.

In 2009, Symantec introduced a managed service, whereby Symantec staff deploy and manage Symantec Endpoint Protection installations remotely. A Small Business Edition with a faster installation process was released in 2010. In February 2011, Symantec announced version 12.0 of Endpoint Protection. Version 12 incorporated a cloud-based database of malicious files called Symantec Insight. Insight was intended to combat malware that generates mutations of its files to avoid detection by signature-based anti-malware software. In late 2012, Symantec released version 12.1.2, which supports VMware vShield.

A cloud version of Endpoint Protection was released in September 2016. This was followed by version 14 that November. Version 14 incorporates machine learning technology to find patterns in digital data that may be indicative of the presence of a cyber-security threat. It also incorporates memory exploit mitigation and performance improvements.

== Features ==
Symantec Endpoint Protection is a security software suite that includes intrusion prevention, firewall, and anti-malware features. According to SC Magazine, Endpoint Protection also has some features typical of data loss prevention software. It is typically installed on a server running Windows, Linux, or macOS. As of 2018, Version 14 is the only currently-supported release.

Endpoint Protection scans computers for security threats. It is used to prevent unapproved programs from running, and to apply firewall policies that block or allow network traffic. It attempts to identify and block malicious traffic in a corporate network or coming from a web browser. It uses aggregate information from users to identify malicious software. As of 2016, Symantec claims to use data from 175 million devices that have installed Endpoint Security in 175 countries.

Endpoint Protection has an administrative console that allows the IT department to modify security policies for each department, such as which programs or files to exclude from antivirus scans. It does not manage mobile devices directly, but treats them as peripherals when connected to a computer and protects the computer from any malicious software on the mobile devices.

== Vulnerabilities ==
In early 2012, source code for Symantec Endpoint Protection was stolen and published online. A hacker group called "The Lords of Dharmaraja" claimed credit, alleging the source code was stolen from Indian military intelligence. The Indian government requires vendors to submit the source code of any computer program being sold to the government, to ensure that they are not being used for espionage. In July 2012, an update to Endpoint Protection caused compatibility issues, triggering a Blue Screen of Death on Windows XP machines running certain third-party file system drivers. In 2014, Offensive Security discovered an exploit in Symantec Endpoint Protection during a penetration test of a financial services organization. The exploit in the Application and Device control driver allowed a logged-in user to get system access. It was patched that August. In 2019, Ofir Moskovitch, a Security Researcher discovered a Race Condition bug which involves 2 Critical Symantec Endpoint Protection Client Core Components: Client Management & Proactive Threat Protection and directly results in Protection Mechanism Failure that can lead to a Self-Defense Bypass, aka "SEMZTPTN" - Symantec Endpoint Minimized Timed Protection.

== Reception ==
According to Gartner, Symantec Endpoint Protection 14 is one of the more comprehensive endpoint security products available and regularly scores well in independent tests. However, a common criticism is that customers are "fatigued" by "near constant changes" in the product and company direction. SC Magazine said Endpoint Protection 14 was the "most comprehensive tool of its type . . . with superb installation and documentation." The review said EndPoint Protection had a "no-brainer setup and administration," but it does have a "wart" that support fees are "a bit steep."

Forrester said version 12.1 was the most complete endpoint security software product on the market, but the different IT security functions of the software were not well-integrated. The report speculated the lack of integration would be addressed in version 14. Network World ranked Symantec Endpoint Protection sixth in endpoint security products, based on data from NSS Labs testing.
