= Level Seven (hacker group) =

Hacker group

The Level Seven Crew
- Level Seven Crew Logo
- Formation: 1994-2000
- Purpose: Hacker groups, Hacker
- Location: United States
- Origin: North, New Jersey
- Founders: foil vent
- Affiliations: Global Hell, Hacking for Girliez

The Level Seven Crew, also known as Level Seven, Level 7 or L7 was a hacking group that was in operation during the mid to late 1990s. It is rumored to have dispersed in early 2000 when the founder 'vent' was raided by the FBI on February 25, 2000.

== Origins ==
Thought to have been derived from Dante Alighieri’s novel, The Inferno. The group called themselves Level Seven after the seventh level of hell, the violent.

Contained in some of the group’s web defacements, was the quote: "il livello sette posidare la vostra famiglia", which loosely translated from Italian says, "Level Seven owns your family".

The group, spent most of their time on IRC - in the EFnet channel #LevelSeven discussing security, or the lack thereof. The group was also associated with other high-profile hacking groups such as globalHell and Hacking For Girliez.

== Notability ==
The hacking group was noted in Attrition's Top 20 most active groups of all time by claiming responsibility for over 60 unauthorized penetrations of computer systems in 1999 alone, including The First American National Bank, The Federal Geographic Data Committee, NASA and Sheraton Hotels.

Level Seven is also credited with being the first group to hack a .ma domain and server located in Morocco. The server was owned by the Faculté des Sciences Semlalia, Marrakech

However, the group is most widely known for the September 7, 1999 defacement of (The US Embassy in China's Website), in regards to the 1998 U.S. embassy bombings.

Level Seven typify a group of hackers who exploit or attack computers and networks for more than just the thrill and challenge, and for reasons other than money. During their era, they were activists, and they used their computer skills to make political statements and protest actions by government and industry. Thus, they bridged the realms of hacking and activism, operating in a domain that is now called "hacktivism".

== Quotations ==
"I would be inclined to think that normal hackers would not be able to break into something like the US embassy. The security measures they use are very, very different to those protecting a commercial Web server."
- Ian Jonsten-Bryden (British government security expert of Oceanus Security in Suffolk)

"We embrace technology, we learn from it, we use it, and we exploit it. Technology is a very powerful tool, as is knowledge, but some people go beyond these boundaries, testing limits, finding new ways and ideas... we call these people hackers, and we are one of many.."
- vent, September 1999
