= Defacement =

Defacement or disfigurement may refer to:

- Defacement (vandalism), the vandalism of physical objects, like buildings, books, paintings and statues
- Website defacement, an attack on a website that changes the visual appearance of the site
- Defacement (flag), a term used in heraldry and vexillology
- Disfigurement, the state of having one's appearance deeply and persistently harmed medically
- Disfigured, a 2015 extended play by Rag'n'Bone Man
