= TNB =

TNB may stand for:

- Trinitrobenzene, kinds of nitrated benzene-derivatives
- Tacoma Narrows Bridge, Washington state, US
- Throgs Neck Bridge, New York City, US
- TNB frame (Tangent-Normal-Binormal), a mathematical coordinate system
- Tenaga Nasional Berhad, an electricity company in Malaysia
- National Theatre Bucharest (Teatrul Naţional "Ion Luca Caragiale" București)
- The National Bank (Palestine)
- Transthoracic needle biopsy, a type of lung biopsy
- Tuas Naval Base, the second naval base of the Republic of Singapore Navy
