= David Brumley =

American cryptographer

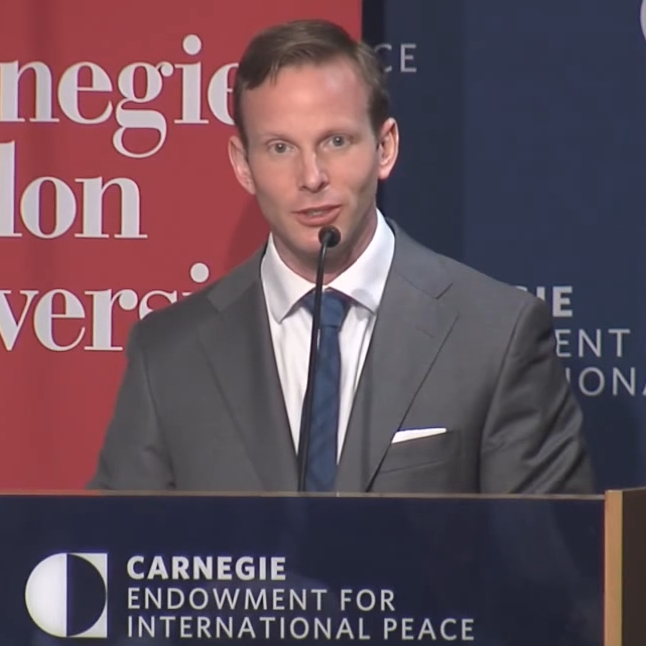
- Brumley in 2016
- Education: Carnegie Mellon University; Stanford; University of Northern Colorado
- Known for: software security and applied cryptography
- Awards: Presidential Early Career Award for Scientists and Engineers
- Scientific career
- Fields: computer science
- Workplaces: Carnegie Mellon University
- Doctoral advisor: Dawn Song

David Brumley is a professor at Carnegie Mellon University. He is a well-known researcher in software security, network security, and applied cryptography. Brumley also previously worked as a Computer Security Officer at Stanford University.

== Education ==
Brumley obtained a Bachelor of Arts in mathematics from the University of Northern Colorado in 1998. In 2003 he obtained an MS degree in computer science from Stanford University. In 2008 he obtained a PhD in computer science from Carnegie Mellon University, where his Advisor was Professor Dawn Song.

== Career ==
Brumley was previously the Assistant Computer Security Officer for Stanford University. Brumley is the faculty advisor to the Plaid Parliament of Pwning (PPP), Carnegie Mellon University competitive security team.

Some of his notable accomplishments include:

- In 2008, he showed the counter-intuitive principle that patches can help attackers. In particular, he showed that given a patch for a bug and the originally buggy program, a working exploit can be automatically generated in as little as a few seconds. This result shows that current patch distribution architectures that distribute patches on time-scales larger than a few seconds are potentially insecure. In particular, this work shows one of the first applications of constraint satisfaction to generating exploits.
- In 2007, he developed techniques for automatically inferring implementation bugs in protocol implementations. This work won the best paper award at the USENIX Security conference.
- His work on a Timing attack against RSA. The work was able to recover the factors of a 1024-bit RSA private key over a network in about 2 hours. This work also won the USENIX Security Best Paper award. As a result of this work, OpenSSL, stunnel, and others now implement defenses such as RSA blinding.
- His work on Rootkit analysis.
- His work on distributed denial of service attacks. In particular, he worked towards tracking down the attackers who brought down Yahoo in 2002.
- He was a major contributor towards the arrest of Dennis Moran
- US Patent 7373451, which is related to virtual appliance distribution and migration. This patent serves as part of the basis for founding moka5 by his co-authors.
