= Genocide2600 =

Hacker group

- Formation: 1985
- Dissolved: 2009
- Purpose: Hacking
- Location: United States
- Founders: Travis Ogden
- Website: www.genocide2600.com

Genocide2600 was a hacker group or collective which was active from the 1980s into early 2000. The group's name was explained as a statement designed to show people that they had become desensitized to being shocked by the horrors seen throughout the world such as murder and other atrocities. It was the hope of the founder "Genocide" that the very name or word Genocide would cause people to flinch or experience some sort of revulsion and therefore, wake up a little.

== History ==
The Genocide2600 Group's origin started in approximately 1987 with the group taking part in telephone phreaking, writing and rewriting methodologies for taking advantage of telephony systems and then trading such information on bulletin board systems. The group diversified and became involved with what is now known as social engineering in the early 1990s and then formally computer hacking in the mid-1990s. Because of the varied schools of thought that members of The Genocide2600 Group took part in, the publications that were released by its members are found to be quite scattered in their subject material.

The group gained notoriety by focusing the varied talents of its members to combat child pornography on sites such as AOL. Several members of The Genocide2600 Group joined with a number of other hackers in the mid-1990s (including RSnake and Revelation) interested in the combat of Internet Child Pornography and formed the group "EHAP" or Ethical Hackers Against Pedophilia where they worked with various law enforcement agencies to combat child pornography.

Aside from the battle with child pornography, the Genocide2600 group also supported various ideas and software applications including Snort and Packetstorm by hosting the sites in their infancy. The Genocide2600 group at one point could no longer host Packetstorm as the server was physically relocating across the country, and due to the popularity of the site, it had to be temporarily moved. Tattooman managed to find a home for it on Harvard's servers resulting in a huge "Hacker Crossfire". Later, the site was purchased and brought up on "Kroll-O'Gara".

== Members ==
As of 2011 exactly what has happened to all of the members of The Genocide2600 Group is not known. Those members still in contact or desiring to be public include: Travis Ogden "Genocide", William Marquette "Doxavg", Ken Williams "Tattooman", Jim Forster "The Weasel", Andrew Schlotfeldt "Astroboy", Alex Richardson "Overlord", Joe Aronow "Godpunk" and Cody Ogden "Wizdom".

Other members included (legal names withheld): Stranger, Loki, Dequeue, Speedygrl, Spikeman, S7urm, Bernz, Revelation, P4nd0r4, Jigz, Alexu, Mantis.
