= Prime Suspectz =

Hacker group

- Founder: x-s4nd3r, k4m1k4z3, överki££ and 4n1cl4t0r
- Type: Hacker group
- Legal status: Inactive
- Location: Brazil

Prime Suspectz was a Brazilian hacker group active in the beginning of the 2000s. It was known for perpetrating website defacements, specially against Microsoft and governamental websites.

== Activities ==
The hacker group was created in the 2000s by x-s4nd3r, k4m1k4z3, överki££ and 4n1cl4t0r, who were between 17 and 19 years old. They reportedly perpetrated website defacements for social and political reasons, but later they made it for fun. To Terra, they said their actions were moved partially for fame, but also to express their freedom of expression and to warn companies of their vulnerability.

According to them, they have perpetrated more than 750 website defacements. They were known for being fast, with some defacements being done in half an hour. Some pages hacked by the group were The Walt Disney Company, WebWatch, from The Wall Street Journal, Nike, Inc., the personal websites of Mel Gibson, Denzel Washington and Jennifer Aniston, Nasdaq, NEC, Panasonic, BMW, Chevrolet, Nintendo, Bradesco and eBay.

The group deemed Microsoft servers the easiest to invade and targeted the company on several occasions. Amongst the websites defaced were MSNBC Sports Scoreboard and the subsidiaries in Mexico, Saudi Arabia, the United Kingdom and New Zealand.

They have also invaded important governamental pages, including domains from the United States Military, the governments of the United States, Taiwan, China and Japan, the FBI, NASA's Geostationary Operational Environmental Satellite Project, the Canadian Office of the Superintendent of Financial Institutions, the Mexican State Commission of Public Services, Central Bank of Brazil, the Brazilian National Congress and the Brazilian Ministry of Health's AIDS website.
