= Red Hacker Alliance =

Hacker group

The Red Hacker Alliance (中国红客联盟) is an informal group of Chinese hackers that at one time had over 80,000 members, making it one of the largest hacking groups in the world. In December 2004, the group took down their website and became inactive until March 2005, when it regrouped and relaunched its site. Computer World Australia and InformationWeek both reported that members of the Red Hacker Alliance were involved in a planned DDOS attack against CNN.com on April 19, 2008. CNN reported that they took preventive measures after news broke of the impending attack.

== See also ==
- GhostNet
- Honker Union
- RedHack (from Turkey)
