= TeslaTeam =

Hacker group

- Formation: 2010
- Location: Serbia

TeslaTeam is a group of computer hackers. Using denial of service attacks, defacement, and other methods, it mainly targets political groups and Albanian websites, including news organizations and human rights groups. TeslaTeam is currently the only virtual army in Serbia to openly launch cyber attacks.

== Targets ==
TeslaTeam mainly targets websites of political organisations, NGOs, and websites of anti-Serb organisations.

== Attacks ==
TeslaTeam's attacks began in February 2013, during a demonstration against the introduction of the Cyrillic alphabet and Serbian language in Vukovar. They began operation Cirilica which led to defacement and security breaches on over 100 websites across Croatia.

=== Timeline of notable defacements ===
- 9 February 2013: Vukovar Institute for Peace Research and Education
- 13 February 2013: Polytechnic Lavoslav Ružička Vukovar
- 18 February 2013: Croatian Bishops' Conference
- 20 February 2013: University of Osijek
- 25 February 2013: Croatian Pure Party of Rights
- 13 August 2013: 200 Montenegro sites defaced
- 30 October 2013: Website of Librazhd Municipality in Albania
- 14 December 2013: 100 Croatian websites defaced

=== Timeline of notable security breaches ===
- 7 November 2012: TeslaTeam claimed to have hacked the website of the Ministry of Economy, Trade and Energy of Albania
- 9 November 2013: TeslaTeam claimed to have hacked the website of the Chicago Tribune
- 13 November 2013: TeslaTeam claimed to have hacked the database of Vevo
- 18 November 2013: TeslaTeam claimed to have hacked the website of E! News
- 29 November 2013: Websites of Bulgarian and Albanian Government
- 29 November 2013: Cambridge University database hacked
- 3 December 2013: Court of Bosnia and Herzegovina
