= LulzSecPeru =

Hacker group

- Founder: @Cyber-Rat and @Desh501
- Type: Hacker group
- Legal status: Inactive
- Location: Peru

LulzSecPeru was a Peruvian hacker group active during the 2010s by @Cyber-Rat and @Desh501. Despite the name, the group has no ties to LulzSec, being much more related to Anonymous. Known for their cyberactivism, it was considered "the region's most skillful and accomplished hacktivist team".

They were responsible for the 2014 e-mail leak known as "CornejoLeaks", that revealed several scandals from René Cornejo's government, ranging from environmental disregard in concessions to irregular use of police force for private purposes. Cornejo's government suffered a motion of no confidence and survived by one vote. Shortly after, the group ceased operations to avoid being prosecuted.

== Description ==
LulzSecPeru was created in the 2010s by @Cyber-Rat and @Desh501. The first was 17 years old, while the latter appeared to be between 19 and 21 years old and also to be a college student. They affirm to be autodidacts, learning how to program at 8 and 6 years old, respectively. Rat was more outgoing and responsible for most of the group's relationship with other cyberactivists and making their achievements public on social media, while Desh was more discreet and focused on the technical aspects of hacking.

Despite the name, the hacker group is not a branch of LulzSec. According to the creators, the name was chosen as "lulz is a way of laughing instead of crying. It's a laugh of shame and separation. It's schadenfreude".

The group is dedicated to hacking for mocking purposes against political targets and cyberactivism in Latin America, exposing the relations of the governments with corruption and illegal drug trade. They openly advocated for freedom of speech and government transparency. They have hacked the governments of Peru, Chile, Colombia, Argentina and Venezuela, and had the help of the hacker group Anonymous to publicize their actions. They've said to avoid hacking the United States government to escape being investigated by the FBI.

== Activities ==
=== Main attacks ===
In 2011, the group hacked the Ministry of the Interior of Peru, their first hacking in big proportions.

On 6 March 2012, the group hacked and defaced the Peru Police Information website. They've also intercepted e-mails from the Police to Facebook and discovered Evans Daniel Velásquez was the one responsible for neutralizing Anonymous profiles on the social media. According to the group, on this hack, they discovered they knew more about the police than the police knew about them.

In August 2012, the group defaced Chilevisión for offences against the Bora people during a reality show.

In September 2012, the group defaced the page of Chile's Ministry of Justice and wrote offences to the president Sebastián Piñera.

On 20 October 2012, the group hacked the Peruvian Scientific Web, the main company responsible for the .pe domain, and dumped data of 114 thousand people, composed of their names, telephone numbers, e-mails and passwords from websites hosted in the .pe domain, including banks.

On 30 December 2012, the group hacked the Ministry of Defense of Argentina, dumped approximately 328 MB of confidential data and defaced their website. The documents posted included repairing of helicopters, modernization of infrastructure and data about airplanes, submarines and weaponry. The group also defaced the webpage of the Officer School of the Chilean Army, posted e-mails from the United Socialist Party of Venezuela and defaced the webpages of some Peruvian companies. The attacks were coordinated with the activities of other Latin American hacker groups, including Anonymous Honduras and Anonymous Argentina.

In February 2013, the group defaced Chile's Ministry of Justice website for the second time.

On 14 April 2013, during the 2013 Venezuelan presidential election, the group hacked the Twitter pages of Nicolás Maduro, Teresa Maniglia and the United Socialist Party of Venezuela (PSUV), posting their logo in their profile picture.

In June 2013, the group hacked the Chilean Air Force and dumped hundreds of e-mails containing negotiations and contracts with the Israeli company Rafael Advanced Defense Systems and personal information of staff and their relatives. The said reason was vengeance for the government of Peru's hack in 2009 perpetrated by Chileans.

In July 2013, the group hacked and defaced Peru’s Citizen Service Portal, dumping a huge amount of personal data on Pastebin.com. The reason given was that the website was hosted on a Global Crossing server, then owned by Level 3 Communications, accused of being one of the biggest vendors of data to the National Security Agency.

On 16 November 2013, the group defaced the main page of the Presidency of the Republic of Peru and posted a photomontage made by the magazine Caretas and offences against Ollanta Humala.

Among other targets are Sony, Fox TV, News Corp and the National Police Service from the United Kingdom.

=== CornejoLeaks ===
In August 2014, the group hacked the Ministry of the Interior and leaked about 3.500 e-mails ranged from February to June of that year, and other documents exposing corruption schemes amongst René Cornejo's Ministers. All the data was posted on a blog called Utero.pe. The documents released were related to the Movadef and the National Directorate of Intelligence, besides some access keys to some government pages.

Amongst the leaked e-mails, was the concession of petrol exploration by an Australian company in disregard of the effects it would cause in the lifecycle of whales and other sea creatures, a concession by the fishing lobby to extend their anchoveta fishing season and the espionage of six leaderships in Cajamarca that opposed the Conga Project; Gregorio Santos, Marco Arana, Wilfredo Saavedra, Ydelso Hernández, Milton Sánchez and Edy Benavides.

Part of the e-mails and documents were related to the López Meneses case, where the National Police of Peru was being accused of favouring some of their officers and using policemen in irregular activities. The e-mails, sent to Roberto Reynoso, vice-minister of Wilfredo Pedraza, contained lists of generals who were recently expelled from the force and others who ought to be expelled. Another e-mail contained names for their replacement, including Carlos Morán, Aldo Miranda and Carlos Gómez Cahuas, all previously related to the scandal. Another e-mail affirmed that the Comptroller General Fuad Khoury had on 10 December 2013 16 irregular officers taking care of his security.

Another e-mails showed that Wilson Hernández, head of the General-Directorate of Intelligence, was unifying criteria to justify the high costs of his Ministry, as in that year the costs rose to 776%.

The government affirmed that the information leaked was false and threatened to sue the perpetrators under the Law of Informatic Crimes. Nevertheless, there was a huge public backlash against the government, resulting in a motion of no confidence. The government survived the motion by one vote.

== End of activities ==
The group came to an end in 2014, after the backlash of CornejoLeaks. The repercussions of their hack were beyond of what they've imagined. According to the Associated Press reporter Frank Jack, Rat announced he would stop with the illegal activities, as he's just turned 18 and was afraid of being prosecuted. Desh expressed his wishes of hosting a WikiLeaks-equivalent website for Latin America, but the project was never released.
