= Bangladesh Black Hat Hackers =

Bangladeshi hacker group

- বাংলাদেশ ব্ল্যাক হ্যাট হ্যাকার্স
- Logo of BBHH
- Nickname: BD Black Hats
- Formation: 2 January 2012
- Type: Hacker group
- Legal status: Inactive

Bangladesh Black Hat Hackers (also known as BD Black Hats) (Bengali: বাংলাদেশ ব্ল্যাক হ্যাট হ্যাকার্স) is a hacker group based in Bangladesh. It claimed in 2012 to have hacked Indian websites in retaliation for border killings by the Indian Border Security Force and the construction of the Tipaimukh Dam. Although Bangladesh Black Hat Hackers declared this cyber war, they were later joined by two other Bangladesh-based hacker groups Bangladesh Cyber Army and 3xp1r3 Cyber Army.

The incident is described as a cyber war without the presence of any governmental personnel in it. The threat of the attack was given on 9 February 2012 and until 12 February. Ten thousand websites were hacked. The number rose to 20,000 later.

Around March 2015, the group also took responsibility for hacking Shashi Tharoor's website, owing to negative comments against Bangladesh's cricket win against England.

== See also ==
- Anonymous (hacker group)
- Indian Cyber Force
- LulzSec
