= OurMine =

Hacker group

- OurMine logo
- Formation: September 14, 2014; 12 years ago
- Type: Hacker group
- Website: ourmine.org

OurMine is a hacker group that is known for hacking popular accounts and websites, such as Jack Dorsey and Mark Zuckerberg's Twitter accounts. The group often causes cybervandalism to advertise their commercial services, which is among the reasons why they are not widely considered to be a "white hat" group. As of 2016, their commercial services included security scans and audits. Payments were collected through PayPal. The group states they do not change passwords of hacked accounts.

== History ==
=== 2016 ===
In 2016, OurMine hacked the Twitter accounts of Wikipedia co-founder Jimmy Wales, Pokémon GO creator John Hanke, Twitter co-founder Jack Dorsey, Google CEO Sundar Pichai, and Facebook co-founder Mark Zuckerberg, whose Pinterest was also hacked. In addition to social media accounts, the group has hacked the website TechCrunch.

In October, BuzzFeed News published an article linking the OurMine group to a Saudi Arabian teenager using the name Ahmad Makki on social media. OurMine denied the allegations, claiming that Makki was only a "fan" of the group. One day after the article's publication, OurMine infiltrated BuzzFeed's website and altered the content of several posts to read "Hacked By OurMine".

Other 2016 hacks include the Twitter accounts of Sony President Shuhei Yoshida; the Wikimedia global account of Jimmy Wales; the Twitter accounts of Netflix and Marvel; the Twitter accounts of Sony Music Global; the Instagram accounts of National Geographic; and the Twitter accounts of National Geographic Photography.

=== 2017 ===
In 2017, OurMine hacked into a Medium website employee account. The account was part of a strategic partnerships team, allowing OurMine to hijack blogs belonging to Fortune and Backchannel.

Twitter accounts hacked in 2017 included that of David Guetta, the New York Times, the WWE, and Game of Thrones (along with some other HBO TV shows, and HBO's own official account). They also hacked the Twitter and Facebook accounts of PlayStation (including a claimed leak of the PlayStation Network databases), FC Barcelona, and Real Madrid (including their YouTube channel); several Facebook accounts of CNN were also hacked.

Some YouTube accounts were hacked by OurMine in 2017 included that of the Omnia Media network, gaining access to numerous channels; and various YouTube channels from the Studio71 network were also hacked.

On August 31, OurMine left a message on the homepage of WikiLeaks. "Hi, it’s OurMine (Security Group), don’t worry we are just testing your…. blablablab, oh wait, this is not a security test! Wikileaks, remember when you challenged us to hack you?" The messages went on to accuse Anonymous of trying to dox them with false information and included an exhortation to spread the #WikileaksHack tag on Twitter. The message was visible when the site was accessed from certain locations. At the time of publication, some visitors to the site were greeted with a message saying that WikiLeaks’ account has been suspended.

In September 2017, OurMine claimed responsibility for hacking Vevo and publishing more than 3TB of their internal documents.

=== 2020 ===
In January, OurMine compromised the Twitter, Facebook and Instagram accounts of the NFL and 15 NFL teams.

In February, OurMine compromised Facebook's Twitter account. Later that month, they also compromised the Twitter account of South Korean boy band, NCT 127.

In May, the group OurMine invaded the Brazilian streaming platform Globoplay and sent a notification to all users of the Globoplay app.
