= Ne0h =

Canadian hacker

- Born: Canada
- Occupation: Hacker
- Years active: 1999–present
- Known for: Involvement in GlobalHell hacker group

ne0h is a Canadian hacker who received mass media attention in 1999 because of his affiliation with the hacker group globalHell, and was featured in Kevin Mitnick's book The Art of Intrusion and Tom Parker's book Cyber Adversary Characterization: Auditing the Hacker Mind.

His real identity is unknown.
