= Yemen Cyber Army =

Pro-Yemeni hacker group

The Yemen Cyber Army (YCA) is a pro-Yemeni hacker group that has claimed responsibility for the defacement of the London-based pro-Saudi Al-Hayat website in April 2015, as well as the exfiltration of data from the Saudi Arabia’s Ministry of Foreign Affairs in May subsequently listed on WikiLeaks.

Associated with the 2015 Yemeni Civil War, the group claims to be based in Yemen itself, but there is speculation from security experts they are Iranian-backed based on IP address information and use of the Persian language. Experts suggest the organization is a manifestation of the ongoing proxy war between Iran and Saudi Arabia. Saudi-based Anonymous-affiliated hackers contributed to the ongoing #protest against the Saudi regime.
