= Hackweiser =

Hacker group

- Hackweiser's Famous ./hack Logo
- Formation: 1999
- Dissolved: 2003
- Location: United States
- Origin: North America
- Founders: p4ntera, B33rc4n

HackWeiser was an underground hacking group and hacking magazine. It was a pro-US hacker group. It was one of the top hacker groups in year 2000. It had more than fifteen hackers who were a mix of Grey hat and Black Hat hackers.

They have been noted by the US Attorney's Bulletin in reference to "Responsible hackers". They have won multiple categories in the "State of the Hack Awards" The group has appeared in the news due to having defaced well known websites, including websites owned by Microsoft, Sony, Walmart, Girlscouts of America, Jenny Craig, DARE, Nellis Air Force Base, CyberNanny. and countless others. They also attacked the Fujifilm's branch in the USA and in Switzerland.

== History ==
The group was founded in 1999 by, a Canadian hacker, p4ntera. In 2001, p4ntera suddenly left the group and went missing.

On 1 May 2001, Hackweiser with World of Hell and other haching groups started Project China. The project had an focus of hack attacks based at Mainland Chinese computer systems. It emerged after the spy plane incident.

In 2003, after multiple websites were defaced with anti-war messages, Hackweiser and "DkD" launched an offensive against Arab sites.

The group eventually fell apart and disbanded after the arrest of Jesse Tuttle (Hackah Jak) in mid-2003. Although reports still indicate that many ex-members are active on the underground.
