= Cyber Jihad Movement =

Al-Qaeda–affiliated Islamist hacking group

- حركة الجهاد السيبراني
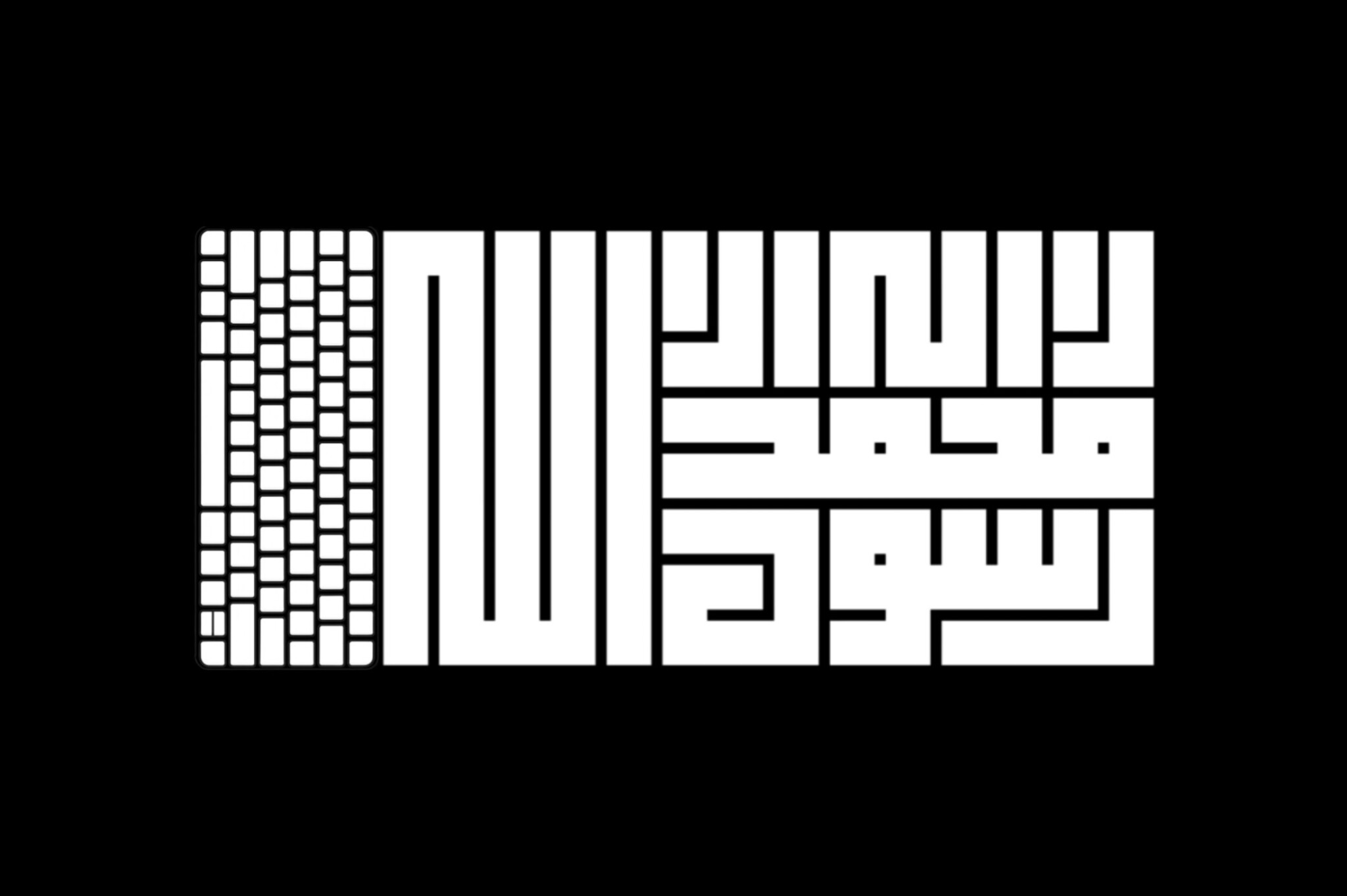
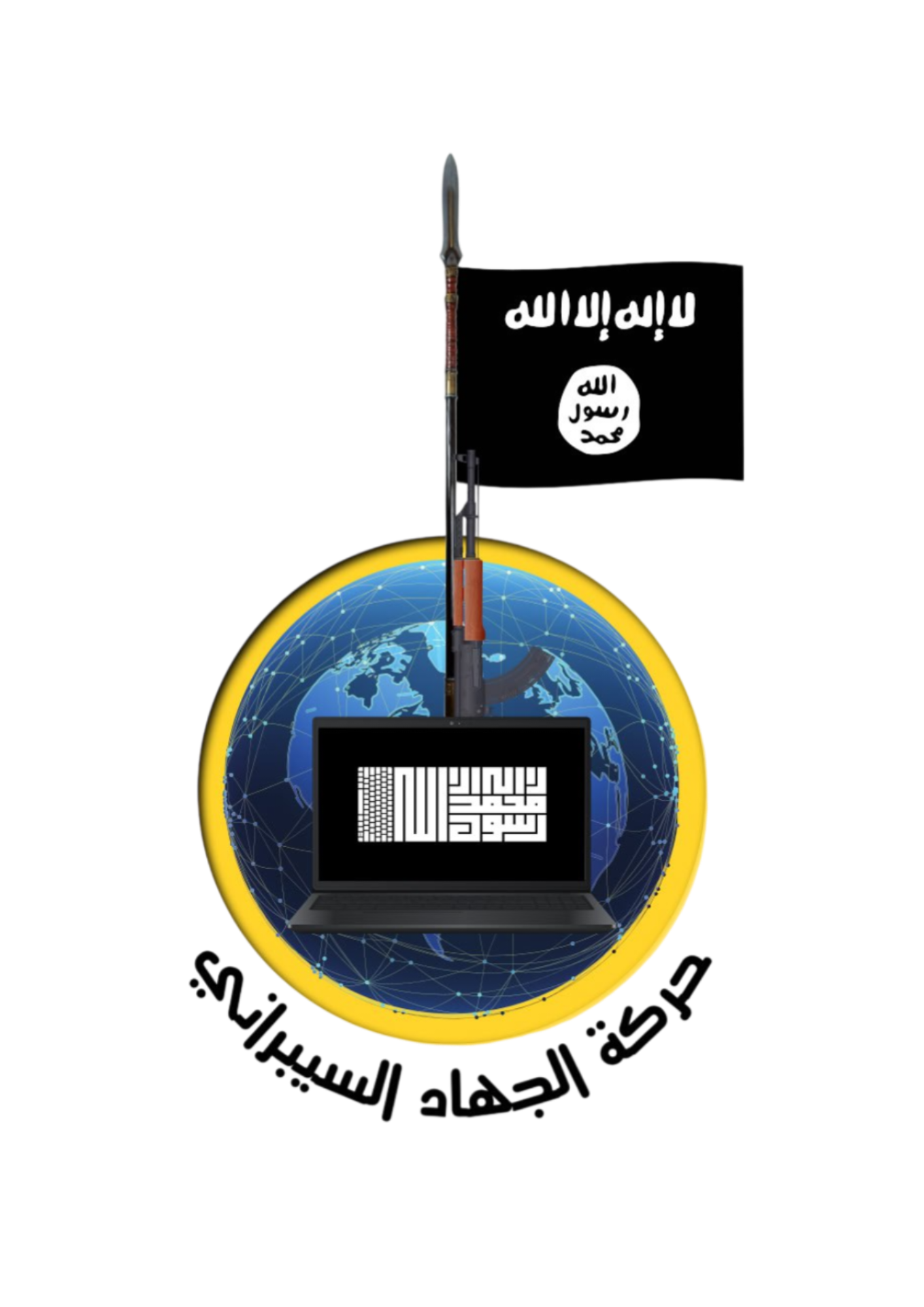
- Flag and logo of Cyber Jihad
- Other name: Cyber Jihad
- Founded: 2025
- Dates active: June 2025 – Present
- Allegiance: Al-Qaeda (August 2025 - Present)
- Ideology: Sunni Islamism; Salafi Jihadism; Islamic Fundamentalism; Sunni-Shia alliance Anti-Zionism; Anti-Americanism; Anti-Europeanism; Anti-Western sentiment Cyber Jihadism
- Status: Active
- Part of: Allied Muslim Hacktivist (August 2025)
- Wars: Involvement in Cyberwarfare: Twelve-Day War (June 2025); Cyberwarfare during the 2026 Iran war (4 March 2026 - present); 2026 Afghanistan-Pakistan War (4 March 2026 - present)

The Cyber Jihad Movement (CJM), also known as Cyber Jihad (romanized: Ḥarakat al-Jihād al-Sībiranī) is a Sunni Islamist hacking group allegiant to Al-Qaeda.

== History ==
The group first emerged during the 2025 Iran–Israel conflict, where it began conducting cyberattacks against Israeli and American digital infrastructure alongside Iranian-linked hacktivist campaigns as part of its pro-Palestine campaign.

According to cybersecurity firms, the Cyber Jihad Movement was one of several hacktivist groups coordinating denial-of-service and website defacement attacks following major escalations in the Iran–Israel conflict.

Analysts at Customer Value Partners (CVP) similarly noted that the group's activity extended to distributed denial-of-service (DDoS) attacks targeting U.S. institutions in mid-2025.

The Cyber Jihad Movement also claimed that its cyber operations would target European governments and institutions in addition to the United States and Israel, under the codename Operation Storm.

On August 22, 2025, the hacking group announced its pledge of allegiance to Al-Qaeda on the group's public Telegram channel in August 2025.

On March 4, 2026, amid Afghanistan–Pakistan war and 2026 Iran war, the group released a statement urging Muslims worldwide to join its global cyber Jihad and vows to assist the Islamic Emirate of Afghanistan and Pakistani Taliban against the Islamic Republic of Pakistan government, and supporting pro-Iran hacking groups against Israel and the United States.

== Recorded attacks ==
On June 18, 2025, the Cyber Jihad Movement took offline the official website of Israeli telecommunication company Bezeq International via DDoS attack.

In June, 2025, the Israeli news website Times of Israel was reported to be taken offline by DDoS attack in collaboration between Cyber Jihad Movement and Team Fearless, the exact date of the event is unknown.

In August, 2025, the Allied Muslim Hacktivist launched a coordinated cyberattack against India amid India's Independence Day.

On September 17, 2025, the Cyber Jihad Movement launched coordinated cyber campaign to commit series of cyberattacks against what it deemed as "hostile targets"
