= Crime Boys =

Hacker group

- Founder: Rage, John the Ripper, Gtk and Leitão
- Type: Hacker group
- Legal status: Inactive
- Location: Brazil

Crime Boys was a Brazilian hacker group active in the beginning of the 2000s. It is known for Government website defacements.

== Activities ==
According to Terra and Folha de S.Paulo, Crime Boys was created by the upper-class teenagers Rage, John the Ripper, Gtk and Leitão to protest against Fernando Henrique Cardoso government and "for the pleasure of accessing data of other vulnerable severs". They allegedly hacked websites for testing purposes, and when they were done, they left a message behind. The group was investigated by the Federal Police of Brazil for their political actions.

Amongst the websites defaced, were the Vatican Radio, the Secretary of Education of Pernambuco, Order of Attorneys of Brazil, Secretary of Public Safety of the Federal District, the Brazilian Ministry of Defense, Empresa de Obras Públicas do Rio de Janeiro, the Supreme Federal Court, the Brazilian Electricity Regulatory Agency, and several US Government websites, including the United States Department of the Interior and the Bureau of Land Management's National Training Center and the Army's Reserve Officer Training Corps Command from United States Army. They also attempted to invade the Jet Propulsion Laboratory from NASA, forcing the agency to block traffic from Brazil.
