= Global kOS =

Hacker group

- Abbreviation: gKos
- Formation: 1996
- Dissolved: 2000
- Type: Hacking
- Region served: us

Global kOS ('kos' pronounced as chaos) were a grey hat (leaning black hat) computer hacker group active from 1996 through 2000, considered a highly influential group who were involved in multiple high-profile security breaches and defacements as well as a releasing notable network security and intrusion tools. Global kOS were involved with the media heavily and were interviewed and profiled by journalist Jon Newton in his blog titled "On The Road in Cyberspace" (OTRiCS). The group were reported multiple times to the FBI by Carolyn Meinel who attempted to bring the group to justice while members of Global kOS openly mocked her. The FBI had a San Antonio based informant within the group and individually raided several members after contact with the informant.

== Overview ==
Global kOS were a loose collective of members of other hacking groups active in 1996 who released network and security tools for Windows and Linux. The group did not release exploit code as other groups did, each member maintained their own webpage and often acted individually or with their original group. Global kOS continually reiterated that their goal was entirely about rampaging across the internet and creating as much chaos as they could by releasing automated denial of service tools. The group was humorous and irreverent in interviews and press releases, they and affiliates openly taunted webmasters through website defacements. The group's members hacked and defaced a large number of websites in the nightly hacking contests over IRC on EFNet.

== Releases ==
- Up Yours! denial of service tool
- Digital destruction suite collection of hacker tools
- Panther modern denial of service tool
- kOS Crack password cracking utilities
- BattlePong IRC flooding utility

=== Up Yours! ===
Up Yours! the flagship release for Global kOS was an early point and click denial of service tool which helped to spawn the term 'script kiddie'. Up Yours! first appeared in 1996 and updated versions were released three times. Up Yours! was the denial of service tool used in the well-documented Nizkor attack. It is believed that the hacker 'johnny xchaotic' aka 'Angry Johnny' used Up Yours! to take down the websites of 40 politicians, MTV, Rush Limbaugh, the Ku Klux Klan, and multiple others. The author claims he came up with the name Up Yours! because he wanted to hear Dan Rather say it on national television.

In print: Klevinsky, T. J.; Laliberte, Scott; Gupta, Ajay (2004). Hack I.T.: security through penetration testing. Addison-Wesley Professional. ISBN 9780201719567., Stephenson, Peter; Gilbert, Keith (2000). Investigating computer-related crime. CRC Press. ISBN 9781420048872., Wang, Wally (2003). Steal this computer book 3: what they won't tell you about the Internet. No Starch Press. ISBN 9781593270001. and Bosworth, Seymour; Kabay, M. E. (2002). Computer security handbook. John Wiley & Sons. ISBN 9780471269755.

== Members ==
Membership between Global kOS and other hacking groups of the time is difficult to determine as most members were involved in multiple groups, crossover appears between Global kOS, Technophoria, SiN and GlobalHell (gH).

- AcidAngel - Author of the denial of service tools 'Up Yours!' and 'Panther modern'.
- Materva
- Glitch
- The Assassin
- NaCHoMaN - cracker
- The Raven - author of 'kOS Crack'
- Shadow Hunter
- Silicon Toad
- Spidey
- That Guy
- Zaven
- Digital Kid

=== Affiliated members ===
- Modify
- BroncBuster
- Banshee - author of bitchslap
- The Messiah
- Deprave
- Cyan Ide
- Kiss
- dvdman
- The boss
- Revelation
