= Parimal Kopardekar =

- Education: Victoria Jubilee Technical Institute, State University of New York at Buffalo, University of Cincinnati
- Occupation: Air-Space Technologist
- Space career

NASA Air-Space Technologist
- Status: Director, NASA Aeronautics Research Institute
- Missions: UAS Traffic Management

Parimal Kopardekar is a senior technologist for NASA as the Air Transportation Systems and principal investigator for the Unmanned Aircraft Systems Traffic Management project at the NASA Ames Research Center. He holds a doctorate and master's in industrial engineering and bachelor's degree in production engineering. He is the recipient of the Samuel J. Heyman Service to America Medals in the promising innovation category for the UTM system in 2018.

== Unmanned Aircraft Systems Traffic Management ==
Parimal Kopardekar is the inventor of the Unmanned Aircraft Systems Traffic Management (UTM). and the Director of NASA Aeronautics Research Institute The UTM software was recognized as the 2019 NASA Software Of the Year and the UTM patent, the 2020 NASA Government Invention Of the Year. The UTM system was developed by NASA in collaboration with the Federal Aviation Administration (FAA) and over 100 industry and academia partners. The UTM system enables automated airspace access to small Unmanned Aircraft Systems (aka drones) to operate in low altitude airspace below 400 ft (120 m). The operational version of the UTM system is being deployed by the FAA and is known as Low Altitude Authorization and Notification Capability (LAANC). LAANC is currently available at 726 airports around the United States.
