= Legion Hacktivist Group =

Legion
- Formation: c. 2016
- Type: Hacker Group
- Purpose: Internet vigilantism
- Region served: Global

Legion is a hacktivist group that has attacked some rich and powerful people in India by hacking their twitter handlers. The group claims to have access to many email servers in India and has the encryption keys used by Indian banks over the Internet.

== History ==
=== India attacks (2019) ===
Legion came into news when it launched its series of attacks starting with Rahul Gandhi, the member of Indian National Congress.

Reports say that not only Rahul's Twitter handler was hacked but his mail server was also hacked. The very next day, INC's Twitter handler was also hacked and tweeted irrelevant content. The group then hacked Twitter handlers of Vijay Mallya, Barkha Dutt and Ravish Kumar.

=== Hacking of Russian government (2021). ===
Because the Russian government tried to censor Telegram in 2018–2020, the Legion Hacker group hacked a sub-domain belonging to Federal Antimonopoly Service. They did not cause big harm, but they posted a message to the Russian government stating that "The vandalism and destruction Roskomnadzor has caused to internet privacy and Russian anonymity has made them a target of Legion." - This text document was removed after 16 hours but it is still available via Wayback Machine.
