= Exposed.su =

Doxed personal information hosting website

- Website type: Dox hoster
- Website: exposed.su
- Current status: Down

Exposed.su was a website run by Russian hackers focused on the listing of personal information of celebrities, and other high-profile figures. Among the high-profile victims include Michelle Obama, Donald Trump, Arnold Schwarzenegger, Kim Kardashian, Joe Biden, Hillary Clinton, Beyonce and Robert Mueller. The "doxed" documents, which are hosted on the website, include Social Security numbers, credit histories, loan documents and mortgage information of the individuals.

The credit history information appears to have been obtained through the hacking of 3 US credit history databases, Equifax, Experian and TransUnion, by the hacker CosmoTheGod.

In April 2013 Brian Krebs linked his swatting incident to the coverage of this site.

In 2017, a teenager named Eric Taylor, also known by his hacker handle CosmoTheGod, was sentenced to 36 months by United States District Court for the District of Columbia on charges of cybercrime with regards to a conspiracy that resulted in the disclosure of personal information of Trump, John Brennan, Obama, among others on the website. Previously in 2016, a New Yorker named Mir Islam was also arrested by the federal agents for posting CIA director John Brennan's confidential information to Exposed.su and "swatting" 50 people including Michelle Obama and Robert Mueller.

The site was shut down in March 2013 before jumping to other domains and has since been mirrored on a Tor hidden service.
