= Dark Storm Team =

Hacker group

- Formation: 2023
- Purpose: Conducting DDoS attacks, anti-Israel
- Methods: Cyberattacks, DDoS attacks

Dark Storm Team is a pro-Palestinian hacker group that has been active since late 2023. Internet Security Firm Check Point reports they target governments and organizations known to support Israel.

== History ==
Activity by Dark Storm Team was first observed in late 2023 following the October 7 attacks. The group has been noted to use tactics similar to those of the pro-Russia hacker group Killnet and has attacked NATO countries, Israel and the U.S. with large-scale DDoS campaigns as well as ransomware attacks. While the group is vocal about its political motivations, it has also advertised itself as hackers-for-hire.

The group has claimed responsibility for cyberattacks on John F Kennedy Airport, Los Angeles International Airport, and Snapchat. Dark Storm Team also took responsibility for the March 10, 2025 cyberattack on X, causing multiple outages.
