= Packet Storm =

Information security website

- Website type: Computer security
- Creator: The Packet Storm Team
- Website: packetstorm.news
- Commercial: Yes
- Launched: 1998; 28 years ago

Packet Storm Security is an information security website offering current and historical computer security tools, exploits, and security advisories. It is operated by a group of security enthusiasts that publish new security information and offer tools for educational and testing purposes.

== Overview ==
The site was originally created by Ken Williams who sold it in 1999 to Kroll O'Gara and just over a year later, it was given back to the security community. While at Kroll O'Gara, Packet Storm awarded Mixter $10,000 in a whitepaper contest dedicated to the mitigation of distributed denial of service attacks. Today, they offer advertisements and API access as services and the site is referenced in hundreds of books.

In 2013, Packet Storm launched a bug bounty program to buy working exploits that would be given back to the community for their own testing purposes. Later that year, they worked with a security researcher to help expose a large scale shadow profile issue with the popular Internet site Facebook. After Facebook claimed that only 6 million people were affected, additional testing by Packet Storm exposed that the numbers were not accurately reported.
