= Disk footprint =

Disk footprint (or storage footprint) of a software application refers to its sizing information when it's in an inactive state, or in other words, when it's not executing but stored on a secondary media or downloaded over a network connection.

Disk footprint gives a sense of the size of an application, typically expressed in units of computer bytes (kilobytes, megabytes, etc.) that would be required to store the application on a media device or to be transmitted over a network. Due to organization of modern software applications, disk footprint may not be the best indicator of its actual execution time memory requirements - a tiny application that has huge memory requirements or loads a large number dynamically linked libraries, may not have comparable disk footprint vis-a-vis its runtime footprint.

== See also ==
- Computer data storage
- Disk storage
