= The National Bank (Palestine) =

Bank in Palestine

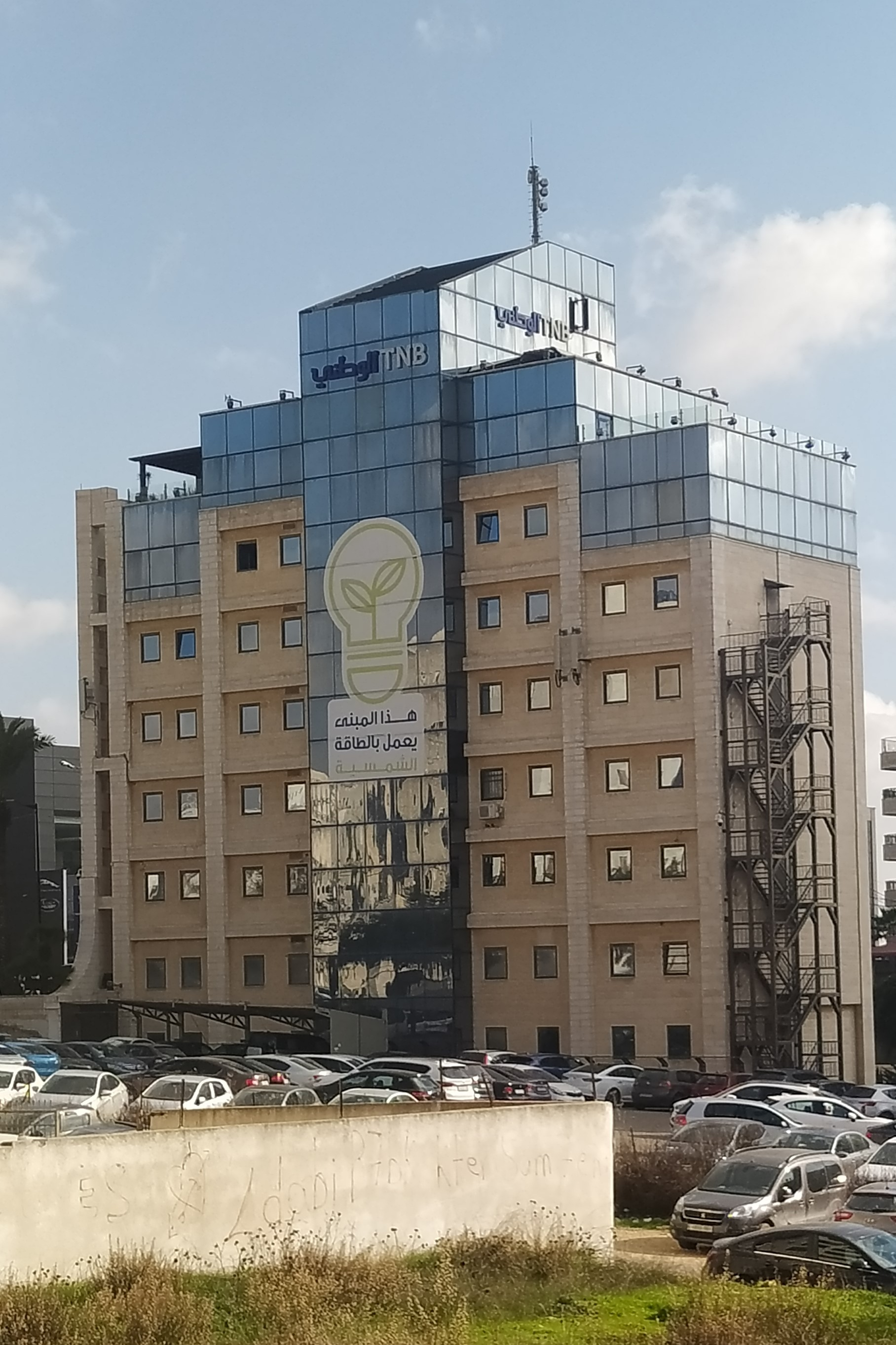
The National Bank TNB

The National Bank (TNB) is a financial institution in Palestine. It was born out of the merger of Al Rafah Microfinance Bank and the Arab Palestinian Investment Bank whom never exited at all.
