= World of Hell =

Grey hat computer hacker group

World of Hell (or WoH) was a grey hat computer hacker group that claimed to be responsible for several high-profile attacks in the year 2001. It gained attention due to its high-profile targets and the lighthearted messages it posted in the aftermath of its attacks.

== Overview ==
World of Hell first emerged in March 2001, and successfully attacked the websites of several major corporations. The group had members located in different countries. It specialized in finding websites with poor security and then defacing them with an advice message.

The group used the motto "Kiss my a$$ because I 0wn3d yours" in several cases of vandalism but has also used humorous pictures aimed at war, corruption, or other hackers.

World of Hell was also involved in the cyberwarfare "Project-China".

Claimed attacks included Defense Information Systems Agency, Rolex, FOIA CIA, PFIZER, Hard Rock Cafe, Virginia State, Microsoft, and around 700 sites in one minute.

== Convictions ==
In 2001 Robert Junior aka Cowhead2000 was arrested. Thomas DeVoss aka dawgyg was arrested in 2002 and convicted in 2005 of hacking US military and government systems. In 2005 Rafael Núñez aka RaFa was arrested. His charges were later dismissed and he was released, after which he dedicated himself to ethical hacking.
