= Website defacement =

Unauthorised changes to the appearance of a website

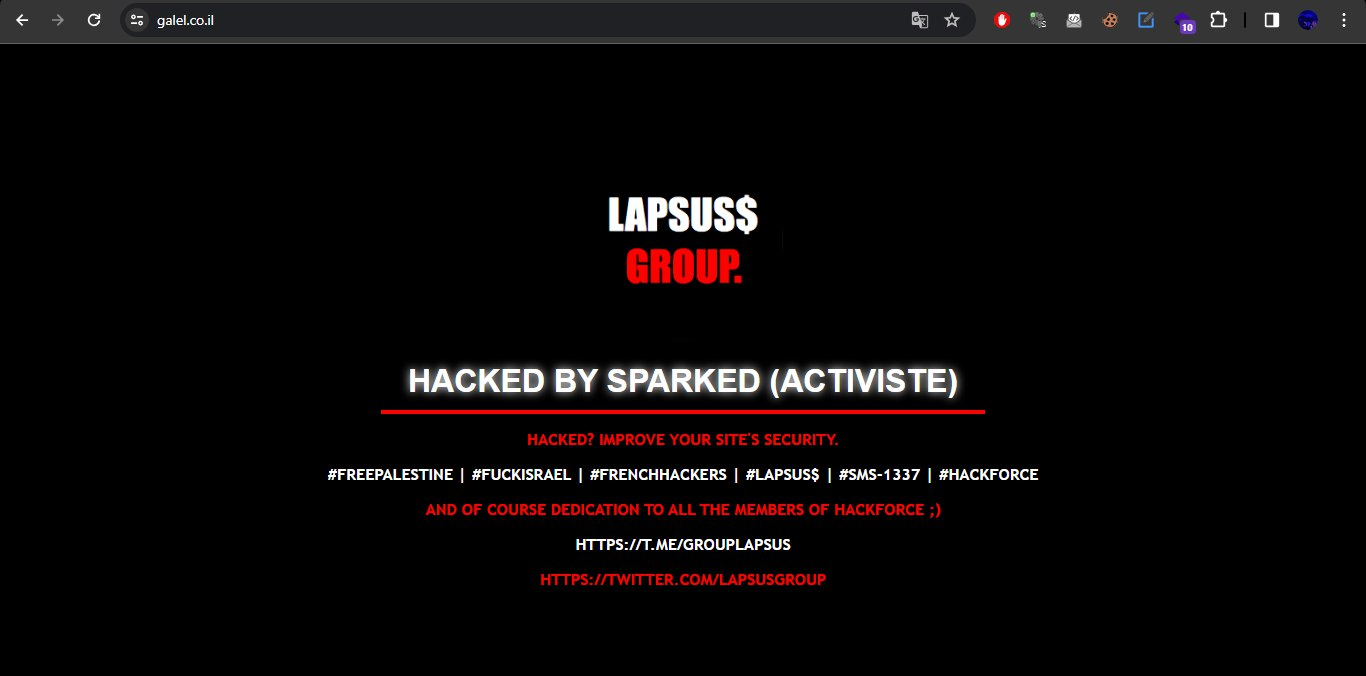
Deface page of Sparked, owner and member of the Lapsus$ hacker group

Website defacement is an attack on a website that changes the visual appearance of a website or a web page. These are typically the work of hackers, who break into a web server and replace the hosted website with malware or a website of their own. Defacement is generally meant as a kind of electronic graffiti and, like other forms of vandalism, is used to spread messages by politically motivated "cyber protesters" or hacktivists. Website defacement can involve adding questionable content, removing or changing existing content to make it questionable, or including nonsensical or whimsical references to websites or publicly editable repositories to harm its reputation. Methods such as a web shell may be used to aid in website defacement.

== Common targets ==
Religious and government websites are regularly targeted by hackers in order to display political or religious beliefs, whilst defacing the views and beliefs of others. Disturbing images and offensive phrases might be displayed in the process, as well as a signature of sorts, to show who was responsible for the defacement. Websites are not only defaced for political reasons; many defacers do it just for the thrill. For example, there are online contests in which hackers are awarded points for defacing the largest number of websites in a specified amount of time. Corporations are also targeted more often than other websites on the World Wide Web and they often seek to take measures to protect themselves from defacement or hacking in general. Websites represent the image of a company or organisation for whom defacement may cause significant loss. Visitors may lose faith in sites that cannot promise security and will become wary of performing online transactions. After defacement, sites have to be shut down for repairs and security review, sometimes for an extended period of time, causing expenses and loss of profit and value.

In 2024, activists hacked the Instagram account of the Berlinale film festival to advocate a ceasefire in the Israel-Hamas war. Their message read in part, "From our unresolved Nazi past to our genocidal present, we have always been on the wrong side of history." The film festival denounced the hack and said it was filing criminal charges.

== See also ==
- Cybercrime
- Hacktivism
- Web security
- Vandalism
- Vandalism on Wikipedia
