= Hacker group =

Group of computer hackers

Hacker groups are informal communities of hackers that began to flourish in the early 1980s, with the advent of the home computer.

== Overview ==
Prior to that time, the term hacker was simply a referral to any computer hobbyist. The hacker groups were out to make names for themselves, and were often spurred on by their own press. This was a heyday of hacking, at a time before there was much law against computer crime. Hacker groups provided access to information and resources, and a place to learn from other members. Hackers could also gain credibility by being a part of an elite group. The names of hacker groups often parody large corporations, governments, police and criminals; and often used specialized orthography.

== See also ==
- List of hacker groups
