= Mohammad Hussein Tajik =

Commander of the Iranian Cyber Army

Mohammad Hussein Tajik was the former commander of the Iranian Cyber Army, and a member of the Quds Force. He was detained and tortured following allegations that he leaked information to the Iranian Green Movement. He is believed to have been assassinated in his home.

== Career and background ==
Tajik was recognized as an elite physics student and was fluent in English, Arabic, and Hebrew. He was recruited into Iran’s intelligence community at the age of 17, following in the footsteps of his father and two older brothers, who were affiliated with the Ministry of Intelligence and Security (MOIS). During his tenure, Tajik led cyber operations targeting foreign adversaries, including social media platforms in China and other nations. He was also responsible for organizing “Cyber Brigades” composed of students to engage in online warfare in support of the regime.

== Internal conflict and death ==
Over time, Tajik reportedly became disillusioned with the regime and was accused of leaking sensitive information to the Iranian Green Movement, a reformist political faction. This led to his detention, torture, and forced confessions of espionage. Tajik was ultimately assassinated at his home in eastern Tehran on July 5, 2016. His death is widely believed to have been orchestrated by Iranian security services as part of internal purges within the cyber and intelligence apparatus, and may have been ordered or committed by his own father, Hajji Vali, a senior intelligence figure.

In 2025, Shane Harris, a reporter for The Atlantic, reported that he had been in contact with Tajik for some time prior to his death, and that Tajik had wanted to use the reporter to disseminate damaging intelligence about the regime, which he said he had grown to hate. Tajik also told Harris that he, Tajik, had been a CIA asset for years, before the CIA cut contact with him (because of his unreliability, Harris surmised), but that he wanted to reestablish contact with the agency through Harris.

== Legacy and significance ==
Tajik’s assassination underscored the intense internal rivalries and factionalism within Iran’s intelligence community, particularly between the Islamic Revolutionary Guard Corps and MOIS. His case highlights the regime's intolerance for dissent and the extreme measures it employs to maintain control over its cyber operations and suppress internal challenges.
