= Gohar Eshghi =

Iranian activist

- گوهر عشقی
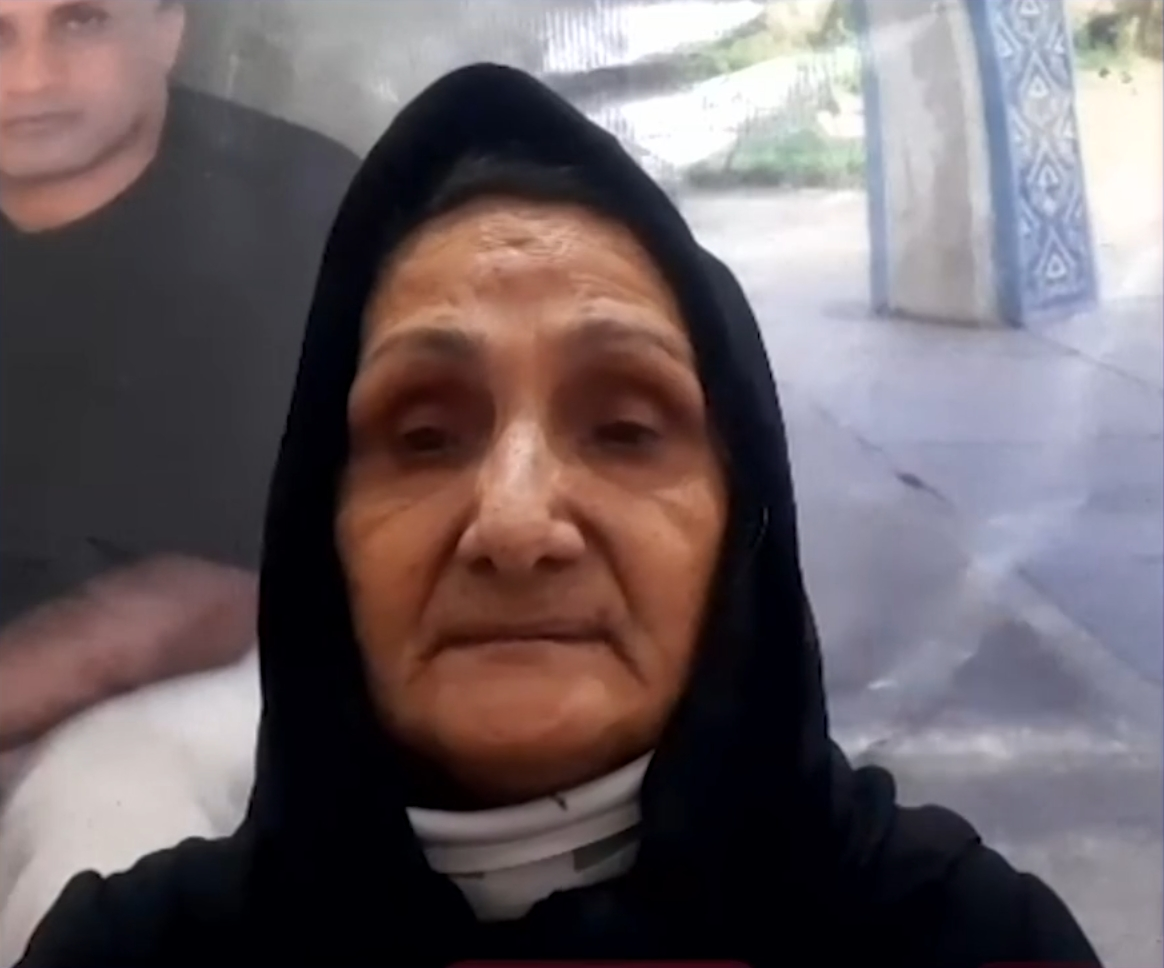
- Born: 1946 (age 79–80); Neishabour, Iran
- Known for: Activist seeking justice for her son Sattar Beheshti
- Children: Sattar, Aliasghar, Rahim and Sahar

Gohar Eshghi (Persian: گوهر عشقی) is a civil activist, one of the Iranian Complainant Mothers and the mother of Sattar Beheshti, Iranian blogger who was killed in November 2012 due to severe torture while in custody of the Islamic Republic security forces in Iran. After the death of her son she made many efforts to bring his killer(s) to justice. She brought media attention to the circumstances of her son's death and caused a wide controversy in the ruling political system of Iran. In 2022, she was named in the BBC 100 Women list.

== Background ==
Gohar Eshghi was born in 1946 in Neishabour, a city in northeast Iran.

She was the second wife of Sardar Beheshti, with whom she had four children: Aliasghar, Sattar, Rahim and Sahar. After separating from her husband she lived with her second son, Sattar. Eshghi had been a housewife all her life, so in order to earn a living after the separation she worked as a cleaning lady and even at a mortuary.

== Sattar's death ==
Gohar's son, 35-year-old Sattar, who was a little-known blogger was arrested at his home on October 30, 2012, by the Cyberpolice (FATA) for what the authorities said were "actions against national security on social networks and Facebook.

He died under suspicious and unclear circumstances while in government custody, but it is believed that he died from suspected torture. On November 6, authorities told Beheshti's family to claim his body from the Kahrizak Medical Examiner's Office and warned them not speak to the media, the reformist news website Kaleme reported. On November 8, Kaleme published a letter the website said came from the blogger in which he wrote that he had been subjected to "physical and verbal abuse" during his interrogations. The letter also said that any confessions he may have made were untrue and extracted under torture, the website reported. On November 10, Kaleme published a letter signed by 41 political prisoners in Evin Prison that said Beheshti's body bore signs of torture and that he was beaten during interrogation, repeatedly threatened with death, and hung from his limbs from the ceiling.

A short time after Sattar's authorities also threatened Gohar's daughter with arrest, badgering and forcing Gohar into signing a letter of legal consent.

In 2014 a court sentenced a police officer named Akbar Taghizadeh, said to have been involved in Sattar Beheshti's murder, to three years in prison, 74 lashes and two years of internal exile. But the officer was only charged with manslaughter, whereas Sattar's family and loved ones, including Eshghi, insist it was premeditated murder. Eshghi holds Khamenei personally responsible for her son's death.

Eshghi was among a group of women who met with former EU foreign-policy chief Catherine Ashton during her 2014 visit to Tehran.

== The Statement of 14 Political Activists ==
Eshghi is one of the signatories of the Statement of 14 Political Activists during the 2017–2018 Iranian protests requesting the resignation of Ali Khamenei from his post as the Supreme Leader of Iran and later the abolition of Islamic republic and establishment of a democratic secular government.

== Attack ==
On December 9, 2021, just before noon Eshghi was on her way to the cemetery to visit her son's grave when two riders approached her on a motorcycle and one of them attacked the elderly woman knocking her to the ground, causing her to sustain injuries to her head and face and lose consciousness. People who saw the incident took her to a hospital.

A statement released by Sattar Foundation on Instagram said that one month prior to the incident security agents had detained the family to prevent them from joining other victims' families from a gathering. During that arrest agents threatened the family that some people die in prison under torture, but some could also die from an accident or in an altercation. After the incident the family kept receiving anonymous threats.

== Removal of hijab in support of protestors ==
On October 18, 2022, and amidst the Mahsa Amini protests Eshghi took off her hijab in a video that she published and said: "For the sake of our youth, after observing this hijab for [almost] 80 years for the religion that wants to kill people, I will take off my hijab." In the same video, she asked people to come to the streets in solidarity with the youth.

On December 11, 2022, Eshghi announced in a video message that she and her family have been threatened by government agents. She emphasized that if anything happens to them, the Supreme Leader, Ali Khamenei would be responsible. She added that the security forces have been threatening her for eleven years, but she and the people of Iran are ready to expel them and their master (Khamenei) from the country. Gohar Eshghi had previously reported threats against her by the clerical regime in early December saying, "No one is afraid of death! Don't threaten!"

== Awards ==
In 2022, BBC included Gohar Eshghi in the list of 100 inspiring and influential women from around the world and praised her as a symbol of endurance and persistence.

== See also ==
- Sattar Beheshti
- Iranian Complainant Mothers
- Human rights in Iran
- Mahsa Amini protests
