= Kamalian (surname) =

Kamalian (Persian: کمالیان) is a surname. Notable people with this surname include:

- Behrooz Kamalian (born 1983), Iranian businessman
- Nasrollah Kamalian (born 1950), Iranian politician
- Naser Kamalian (born 1931), Iranian medical scholar
