= 2025 interception of outbound calls to Iran =

Beginning in mid-June 2025 and tapering off in early July 2025, a widespread telecommunications disruption affected international calls directed to Iranian phone numbers. The disruption occurred amid escalating military conflict between Israel and Iran.

Callers, primarily from the Iranian diaspora in countries such as the United States, United Kingdom, and other Western nations, reported their attempts to reach family and friends in Iran being intercepted by 'automated, robotic voices' delivering 'cryptic, pre-recorded messages' in broken English and Farsi.

The interceptions coincided with Iranian government-imposed internet blackouts and communication restrictions following Israeli airstrikes on Iranian nuclear facilities. Experts speculated that the phenomenon could be the result of a cyber operation, possibly orchestrated by the Iranian regime to control information flow, or by foreign adversaries engaging in psychological warfare.

== Background ==
The interceptions occurred amidst the 2025 Israel-Iran conflict, which erupted in June 2025 following Israeli airstrikes on Iran's nuclear program, including facilities at Fordo and Natanz. Israel justified the attacks as 'preemptive measures' against Iran's alleged pursuit of nuclear weapons, despite Tehran's claims of a 'peaceful program'. In response, Iran launched ballistic missile barrages at Israeli targets.

Iran soon imposed severe communication blackouts (internet shutdowns, mobile network restrictions) to curb the spread of information and potential mobilization against the regime.

Pro-Iranian hackers have targeted Israeli and U.S. infrastructure, and vice versa. Groups like Lemon Sandstorm (affiliated with Iran's Islamic Revolutionary Guard Corps) conducted prolonged infiltrations of Middle Eastern networks. The U.S. Cybersecurity and Infrastructure Security Agency (CISA) issued advisories warning of heightened Iranian cyber threats.

== Description ==
Callers attempting to dial Iranian landlines and mobile numbers from abroad reported their calls being redirected to automated systems playing robotic voices, including the two following messages:

- "Aló [hello]? Aló [hello]? I can't heard [hear] you. I can't heard [hear] you. Who do you want to speak with? I'm Alyssa. Do you remember me? I think I don't know who are you [who you are]."
- "Thank you for taking the time to listen. Today, I'd like to share some thoughts with you and share a few things that might resonate in our daily lives. Life is full of unexpected surprises, and these surprises can sometimes bring joy, while at other times, they challenge us."

Other variations featured philosophical musings or attempts to engage the caller in conversation, such as asking "Who are you?" or playing eerie music before the voice activated. The voices were described as robotic or AI generated.

Calls were typically diverted without ring time. Some labeled this as potential interception at the network level.

No definitive attribution to the phenomenon has been confirmed as of mid-August 2025.

== Responses ==
- The Iranian government issued warnings to "report suspicious calls and attributed disruptions" to adversaries like Israel and opposition groups.
- U.S. agencies CISA and FBI advised vigilance against Iranian cyber retaliation.

== See also ==
- Twelve-Day War
- Cyberwarfare in Iran
- Psychological warfare
