= Muddy Water =

Muddy Water or MuddyWater may refer to:

== Music ==
- "Muddy Water", a 1926 song with lyrics by Jo Trent and music by Peter DeRose & Harry Richman, covered by many artists
- "Muddy Water", a song by English rock group Free, from the 1973 album Heartbreaker
- "Muddy Water", a song by The Seldom Scene from the 1973 album Act III, covered by various artists
- "Muddy Water", a song from the 1985 musical Big River: The Adventures of Huckleberry Finn
- "Muddy Water", a song by country singer Clint Black from the 1990 album Put Yourself in My Shoes
- "Muddy Water", a song by Dallas Crane from the 2006 album Factory Girls
- "Muddy Water", a song by Eddi Reader from the 2007 album Peacetime
- "Muddy Water" (Trace Adkins song), a 2008 single
- "Muddy Water", a song by King Gizzard & the Lizard Wizard from the 2017 album Gumboot Soup
- "Muddy Water", a song by Stray Kids, from the 2022 album Oddinary

== Places ==
- Nam Khun district, a district in Ubon Ratchathani Province, northeastern Thailand
- Waipara, a township in North Canterbury, New Zealand

== Other ==
- MuddyWater (hacker group), an advanced persistent threat computer hacking group sponsored by Iran

== See also ==
- Muddy Waters (born McKinley Morganfield, 1913–1983), American blues musician
- Muddy Waters (disambiguation)
- "I'd Rather Drink Muddy Water", a song by Eddie Miller, recorded by Aretha Franklin as "Muddy Water"
