= Arctic Wolf Networks =

American cybersecurity company

- Logo as of 2026
- Type: Private
- Industry: Cybersecurity
- Founded: 2012
- Founders: Brian NeSmith; Kim Tremblay; Sam McLane; Matthew Thurston
- Headquarters: Eden Prairie, Minnesota, United States
- Key people: Brian NeSmith, Co-founder & Executive Chairman; Nick Schneider, President & CEO; Duston Williams, CFO; Dan Larson, CMO
- Services: Security analytics, Vulnerability management Managed Detection and Response
- Number of employees: 2,000
- Website: arcticwolf.com

Arctic Wolf Networks (commonly called Arctic Wolf) is a privately held American cybersecurity company headquartered in Eden Prairie, Minnesota. The company operates a cloud-native security operations platform which ingests data from endpoints, networks, cloud infrastructure, and identity systems to detect and respond to cybersecurity threats.

As of 2026, Arctic Wolf operates globally in more than 80 countries and provides its platform to over 10,000 organizations.

== History ==
Arctic Wolf was founded in 2012 by Brian NeSmith, the former CEO of Blue Coat Systems, and Kim Tremblay. The founders envisioned a platform that provides an outsourced security operations center. Initially headquartered in Sunnyvale, California, the company launched its managed detection and response services, initially known as AWN CyberSOC, in 2016. The company purchased RootSecure, a cybersecurity risk assessment firm, in December 2018.

In October 2020, Arctic Wolf raised $200 million in a Series E round led by Viking Global Investors at a $1.3 billion valuation, making it the first cloud-native managed detection and response vendor to surpass $1 billion. Concurrently with this funding round, Arctic Wolf relocated its global headquarters from Silicon Valley to Eden Prairie, Minnesota, citing the Midwest's growing tech talent pool.

In July 2021, Arctic Wolf announced a $150 million Series F funding round led by Viking Global Investors and Owl Rock (now Blue Owl Capital), which significantly increased its valuation to $4.3 billion. The following month, Brian NeSmith transitioned to the role of Executive Chairman, and Nick Schneider, the company's former President and Chief Revenue Officer, was promoted to Chief Executive Officer. 2021 was also the year of the company's first expansion into Europe, opening a headquarters in Newcastle, England and a security operations center in Frankfurt, Germany.

Arctic Wolf acquired twelve companies between 2012 and 2025. This included expansion into security training with Habitu8 in 2021, automation with Revelstoke in 2023, endpoint security with Cylance in 2024 (a purchase from BlackBerry completed on February 3, 2025), and AI with Upsight Security in November 2025.
