= Cylance =

American software firm

Cylance Inc.
- Type: Subsidiary
- Industry: Computer security
- Founded: 2012; 14 years ago
- Founder: Stuart McClure; Ryan Permeh
- Headquarters: Irvine, California, United States
- Services: Anti-virus, anti-malware
- Revenue: ▲$189 Million(2021)
- Number of employees: 760
- Parent: Arctic Wolf Networks
- Website: Cylance.com

Cylance Inc. is an American software firm based in Irvine, California, that develops antivirus programs and other kinds of computer software that prevents viruses and malware.

In February 2019, the company was acquired by BlackBerry Limited for $1.4 billion. After the acquisition, it continued to operate as an independent subsidiary an remained headquartered in Irvine, California.

In December 2024, Arctic Wolf entered into an agreement with BlackBerry Limited to purchase Cylance. BlackBerry will sell its Cylance assets to Arctic Wolf for $160 million in cash, subject to certain adjustments, and approximately 5.5 million common shares of Arctic Wolf. After allowing for the purchase price adjustments, BlackBerry received approximately $80 million in cash at closing and approximately $40 million in cash one year following the closing. The sale closed on February 3, 2025.

== Founding ==
Cylance was founded by Stuart McClure and Ryan Permeh in 2012. McClure was previously co-founder of Foundstone, a security consultancy.

== Funding ==
A July 2015 report indicated that Cylance had raised $42 million from investors including Draper Fisher Jurvetson, Kohlberg Kravis Roberts, Dell, Capital One, and TenEleven Ventures. It received another $100 million in June 2016 with lead investors Blackstone Tactical Opportunities (part of The Blackstone Group) and Insight Venture Partners. They received an investment from In-Q-Tel in September 2015.

== Operation Cleaver ==
Operation Cleaver was a covert cyberwarfare operation allegedly carried out by the Iranian government against targets worldwide, specifically critical infrastructure entities. Cylance published a report about the operation in late 2014. Iranian officials rejected Cylance's conclusions, but the FBI tacitly confirmed them.

== Controversies ==
=== Malware scandal ===
In November 2016, a systems engineer evaluated 48 files of malware samples provided by Cylance for testing their protection system "Protect", and found that 7 of them weren't malware. This led to an accusation that Cylance was using the test to look superior to its opponents by providing files that other products would fail to detect as malware. In response, Cylance executives said that they used repackaged malware samples for testing.

== See also ==
- Antivirus software
