= Propaganda in Iran =

Propaganda in Iran originates from the Iranian government and "private" entities, which are usually state controlled.

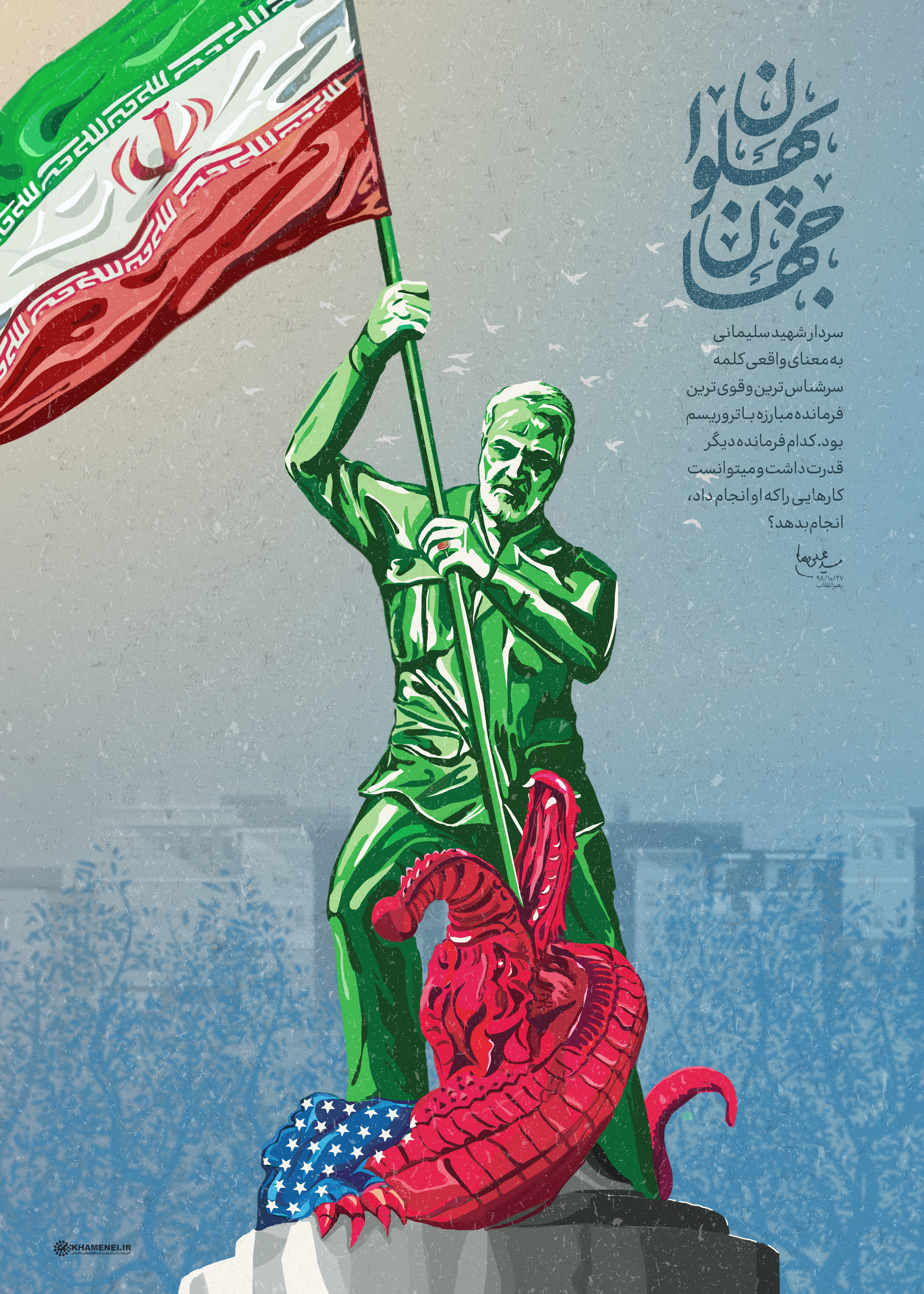
Qasem Soleimani killing a crocodile (USA) with Iran's flag

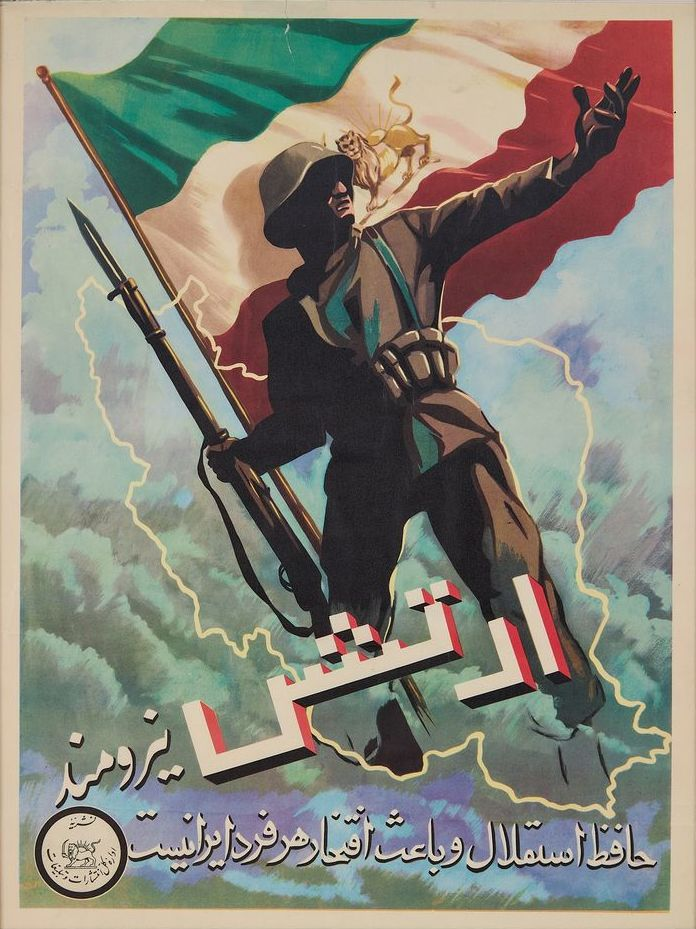
Propaganda poster from the Pahlavi era, c. 1960

Propaganda can be disseminated through any medium, including television, film, newspaper, posters, murals, political actions, rallies, violence, and websites. Propaganda in the Islamic Republic of Iran also includes censorship. According to Garth Jowett and Victoria O'Donnell, "Propaganda is the deliberate, systematic attempt to shape perceptions, manipulate cognitions, and direct behavior to achieve a response that furthers the desired intent of the propagandist."

== Censorship in Iran ==
One of the biggest issues Iran is criticized for is censorship. Aided by Western technology from Nokia and Siemens, the Iranian government has created one of the most sophisticated censorship platforms created in modern times.

== Methods ==
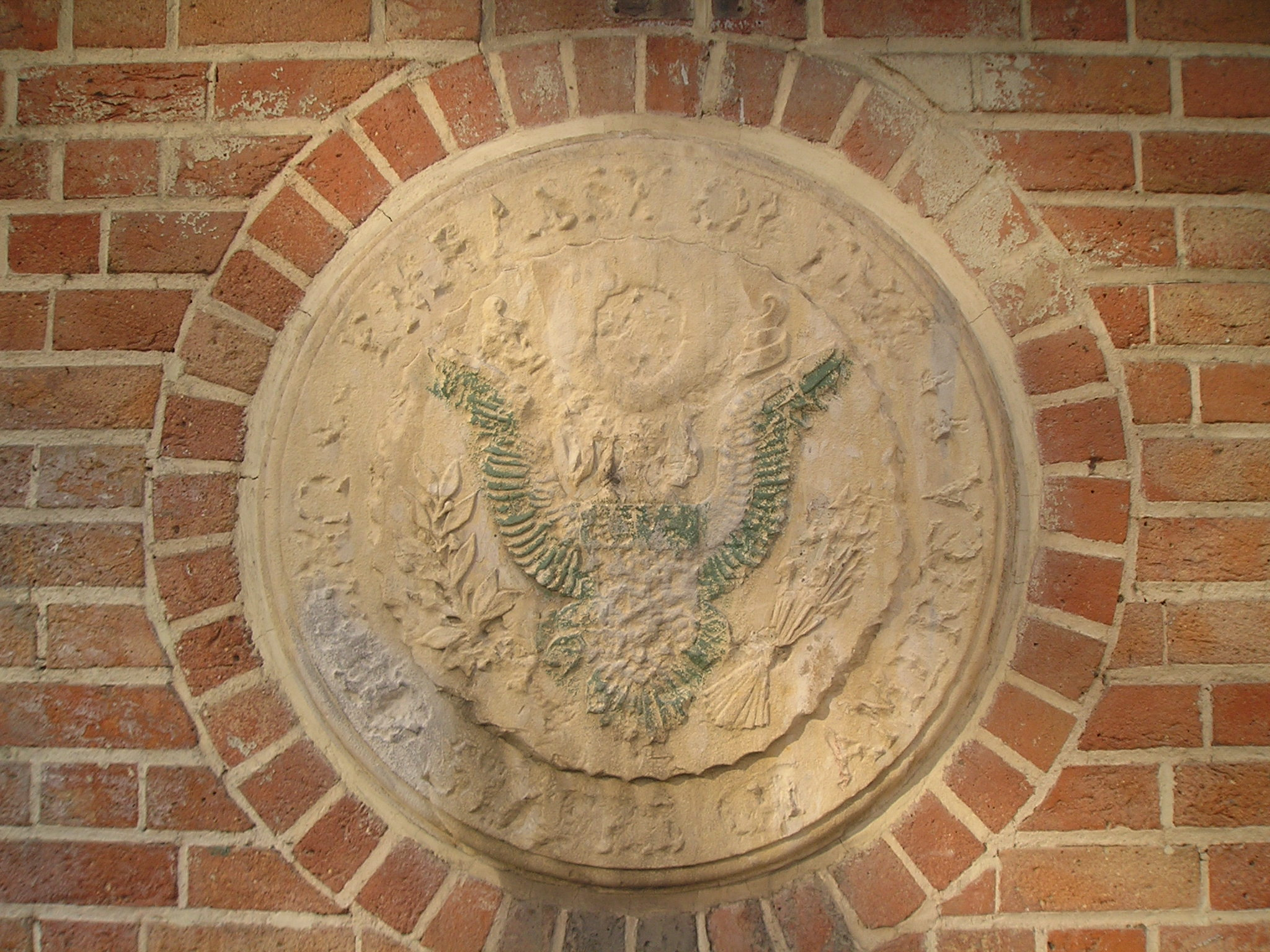
The defaced Great Seal of the United States in 2004. The Iconoclasm shown is a form of propaganda

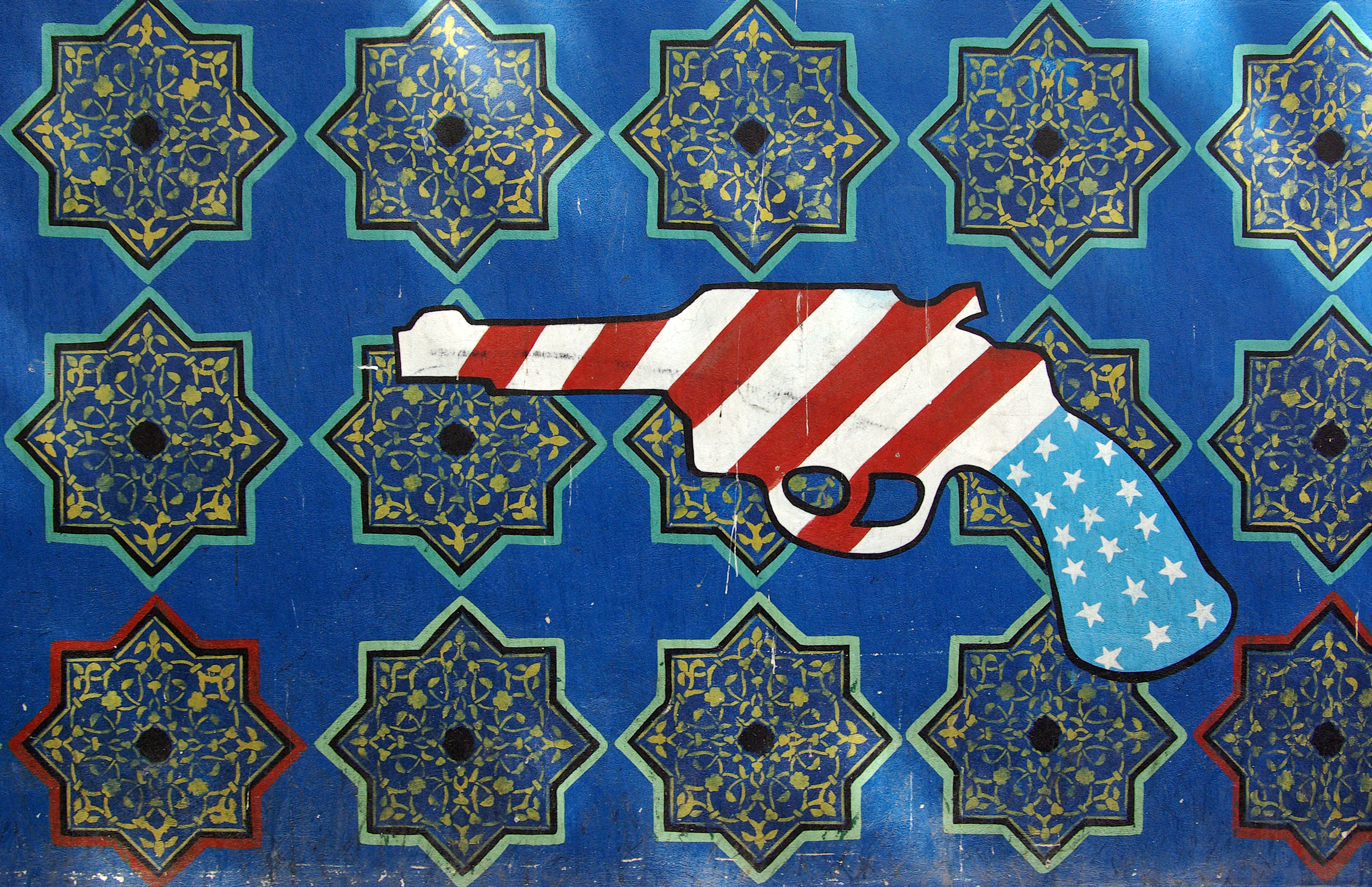
Tehran US embassy propaganda gun

=== Violence/Fear ===
On October 8, 2006, cleric Seyyed Hossein Kazemeini Boroujerdi was arrested for opposing Velaayat-e Faghih, advocating the separation of religion from state, and defending the Universal Declaration of Human Rights.

The Iranian government has also falsely attributed crimes to dissident groups such as the MEK; in a particularly instance with a witness saying he was "pressured and promised a reduced sentence if he would say that his eye injuries had not been caused by the Islamic Republic of Iran but by 'the hypocrites' [—] a word they used to refer to Mojahedin Organization."

=== Judicial system of Iran ===
Iranian Justice System has also been known to espouse propaganda. This is especially true in the prison system of Iran where Political prisoners were "incessantly bombarded with propaganda from all sides ... radio and closed-circuit television ... loudspeakers blaring into all cells even into solitary cells and `the coffins` [where some prisoners were kept] ... ideological sessions." Any reading material of a secular nature such as Western novelists, or even religious material that didn't agree ideologically with the Islamic Republic such as work by Ali Shariati was banned.

=== The Basij ===
The Basij are a component of the Islamic Revolutionary Guard Corps (IRGC). With the IRGC's help and support, Basij members are trained in propaganda and political warfare techniques using media outlets. There are about 21,000 volunteer "reporters" that have trained with the IRGC on multiple waves of communication and media, which include social networks, television, radio, print media, and the internet.

According to Reporters Without Borders, "In Iran, the Revolutionary Guards recently announced their ambition to build their own spinternet by launching 10,000 blogs for the Basij, a paramilitary force under the Guards. This comes at a time when the Internet has become a major force in exposing corruption in the highest ranks of the Iranian leadership." As well, cyber-police "are here to create a cyber police force inside the people’s mind,” said Hesamedin Mojtahed, the officer in charge of the booth. “People want to be informed of the dangers on the Internet,” he said. “We are here for them.”

== Media of Iran ==
=== Islamic Republic of Iran Broadcasting ===
Islamic Republic of Iran Broadcasting (IRIB) is the sole, official provider, of broadcast news in Iran. IRIB operates many channels in a multitude of languages and is known to broadcast propaganda. IRIB is the main hub for which all Iranian propaganda is created and disseminated. The multiple channels that make up IRIB all have a specific purpose. On every IRIB channel, Israel is referred to as the "Zionist Regime".

=== Conferences and Lectures ===
Mahmoud Ahmadinejad's visit to Columbia University in Fall 2007 was, according to BBC News, an attempt to convince international opinion and the United States population of the rightness of his cause.

The Islamic Republic of Iran held an anti-terrorism conference which featured representatives from "neighboring countries Afghanistan, Iraq and Pakistan as well as Sudan, Tajikistan, Mauritania and the Vice-President of Cuba and Ministers and other high-level delegates from 60 States, representatives of the United Nations (Officer in Charge of CTITF), the OIC, and other regional organizations as well as distinguished scholars and researchers and peace activists from all around the world participated in the Conference." With Iran being a state-sponsor of terrorist activities, and many of the nations in attendance, including many of the African representatives, users of terrorism, the anti-terrorism conference is propaganda. It was quite successful as well because the United Nations endorsed the meeting and sent a delegation to partake in the event. During the event, "Iran's Supreme leader Ali Khamenei took the opportunity to excoriate western nations for "terrorist behaviors," and Iranian President Mahmoud Ahmadinejad expressed his doubts about the September 2001 terrorist attacks on America – outrageously claiming that the U.S has benefited from those attacks, as it has, he added, from the Holocaust."

==== Cyber Police ====
Iran has created a Cyber Police unit in January 2011, known by the acronym FATA. Since then it has arrested several bloggers critical of Iran’s leaders, as well as a group of youths who had created a “hot or not” contest on Facebook rating profile pictures of boys and girls The unit was created to "control which sites Iranians are able to visit, to prevent spying and protect the public from 'immoral' material. The United States, they charge, is waging a 'soft war' against Iran by reaching out to Iranians online and inciting them to overthrow their leaders ". From the Iranian regime's standpoint, any free information is a threat to power. The internet was a major factor for organizing and showing the world what was happening during the 2009 presidential election. The United States asked Twitter to postpone online maintenance in 2009 so that it would be available for Iranian protesters. On 1 December 2012, General Saeed Shokrian, commander of FATA, was dismissed by Iranian’s national police chief, Ismael Ahmadi-Moqaddam, for negligence in death of blogger Sattar Beheshti while in FATA custody one month earlier. The dismissal followed international outcry over the death. Shokrian stated “Tehran’s FATA should be held responsible for the death of Sattar Beheshti”.

== Iranian propaganda abroad ==
=== Worldwide ===
Iranian state-controlled media such as Press TV or Mehr News Agency actively target global audiences in multiple languages, including English, French, or Spanish. During the COVID-19 pandemic, these outlets featured Iranian propaganda criticising democracies' response to the pandemic as weak and hypocritical, promoting the Iranian approach in fighting the outbreak, and spreading conspiracy theories about the origin of the virus. One study by the Oxford Internet Institute found that Iranian outlets were heavily active in spreading conspiracy theories suggesting that the virus may have originated in a military biolaboratory.

In June 2021 the U.S. Justice Department said it seized and took offline 36 websites linked to Iran, "many of them associated with either disinformation activities or violent organizations".

=== The Arab World ===
In August 2018, Twitter suspended 770 accounts originating in Iran for engaging in coordinated manipulation In October 2018, Twitter publicly shared data on the 770 accounts on their Election Integrity Hub In a study focusing on the Arab world, the researchers found that more than half of these accounts generated Arabic content to target Arab Twitter users In this study, it was found that the Arabic tweets were not aiming to socially engage with other Arab users but rather to promote certain websites, and more than 69% of the links shared were to pro-Iran Arabic-language news websites The accounts that tweeted in Arabic imitated Arabic local news outlets trying to build credibility in the region

==== Alavi Foundation ====
The Alavi Foundation is the successor organization to the Pahlavi Foundation, a nonprofit group used by Mohammad Reza Pahlavi to advance Iran's charitable interests in America. Most of the charities income is from rent collected on the New York Fifth Avenue skyscraper the Piaget Building, which was built in 1978 under the Shah, who was overthrown in 1979.

The FBI laid out a case against the Alavi Foundation that it was being used as a front group for the Iranian government. It was built in the 1970s by the Pahlavi Foundation to further the interest of then Shah of Iran, Mohammad Reza Pahlavi. Some of the tenants of the foundation's properties are Islamic centers and schools.

== See also ==
- Asymmetric Warfare
- Covert Operations
- Front organization
- Information Warfare
- Insurgency
- Low Intensity Conflict
- Music and political warfare
- Netwar
- Propaganda
- Psychological Warfare
- Unconventional Warfare
- War of Ideas
