= Iranian Complainant Mothers =

Iranian complainant mothers (Persian: مادران دادخواه) or Iranian Mothers for Justice are mothers whose children were killed by the agents of the Islamic Republic in various protests in Iran. These women are the mothers of people who were killed during the 2017–2018 Iranian protests, the 2019–2020 Iranian protests, the 2021–2022 Iranian protests and the downing of Ukraine International Airlines Flight 752 by the Islamic Revolutionary Guards Air Defense.

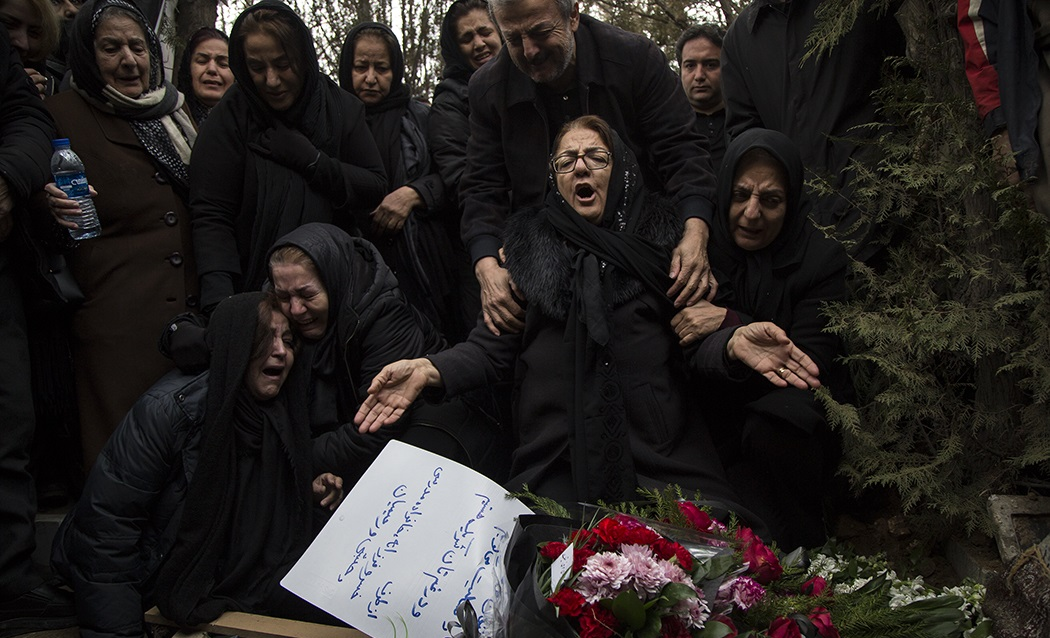

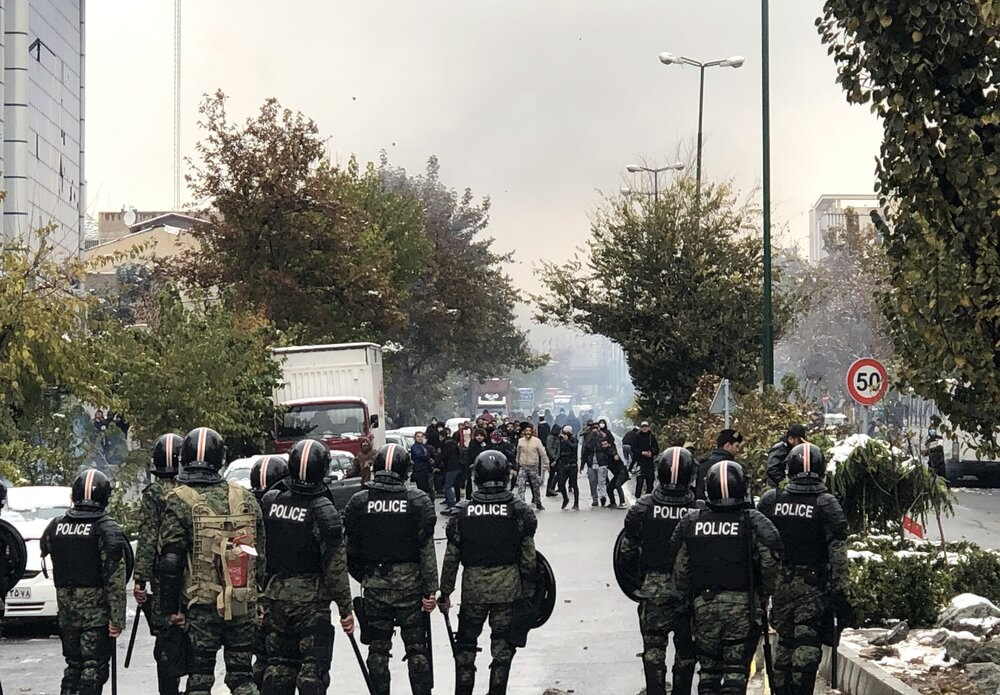
NAJA Special Unit Confronts Protesters in November 2019

Also, the mothers of those killed in the 1988 executions of Iranian political prisoners, who are also known as Mothers of Khavaran, and the mothers of those killed during the 2009 Iranian presidential election protests, known as Mothers of Laleh Park and other mothers of those killed during the rule of the Islamic Republic in Iran can be called Iranian mothers for justice.

== Justice demands ==
Through protests and participation in public gatherings, these women have called for justice, the identification and prosecution of those responsible for the killings, and the end of the Islamic Republic of Iran.

Gohar Eshghi, the mother of Sattar Beheshti, an Iranian blogger who was killed by torture in a detention center in November 2012, is one of the mothers of the petitioners. After the death of her son, she tried hard to bring Sattar's killer or killers to justice. She turned her son's death into a media issue and caused a wide controversy in the ruling political system of Iran.

After Mohammad Taheri was killed in the protests of November 2019, his parents were among those who, without fear, sued for their son's blood. On the eve of Iran's presidential election in June 2021, his mother, Zainab Mohammadi, announced in a video that her vote was not for the Islamic Republic. She said: "We neither forgive nor forget."

== Arresting Iranian mothers for justice ==
On 12 June 2021, Nahid Shirpisheh, mother of Pouya Bakhtiari, along with political activist Narges Mohammadi, mother of Ebrahim Ketabdar, Jafar Azimzadeh and Puran Nazimi, who had travelled to Shiraz to meet Navid Afkari's family, was arrested in front of Adelabad Prison in Shiraz and released after some hours.

On Friday, 7 July 2021, several Iranian mothers for justice were arrested after gathering in Tehran's Azadi Square and chanting slogans in support of the Khuzestan protests and were released a few hours later. The mothers of Ebrahim Ketabdar, Pejman Gholipour, Farhad Mojdam, Sajjad Rezaei, Milad Mohagheghi, Vahid Damour, and the sister of Hamid Rasouli were among those arrested. Emphasising pursuing their right, they have emphasized in their slogans that they seek to overthrow the Islamic Republic. The mother of Pejman Qalipour, one of the victims of the November 2018 protests, said: "Enough with slavery, we are not asking you to support us, support yourselves."

On 11 July 2022, one day before a planned anti-hijab protest, Iran's security arrested families of the victims of the 2019 protests accusing them of "trying to instigate riots".

Security forces raided the home of Rahimeh Yousefzadeh in Tehran on Monday and arrested her and two other mothers whose children were killed by the government during anti-government protests. Yousefzadeh is the mother of Navid Behboudi who was shot dead by security forces in Tehran in November 2019.

Several others, including Nahid Shirpisheh, the mother of Pouya Bakhtiari, and the brother of Vahid Damvar, another victim of government violence, were arrested at their own homes, also on Monday.

In 2023, a number of mothers and fathers of justice and family members of the protesters killed in the cities of Sanandaj, Dehgolan and Divandarreh, who were present to attend the tomb of Mahsa Amini and other killed protesters in the Aichi cemetery of the city of Saqqez, were arrested.

== See also ==
- Human rights in Iran
- Mourning Mothers
- Mothers of Khavaran
- Trial of Hamid Nouri
