= Sattar Beheshti =

Iranian blogger who died in custody of the Iranian Cyber Police unit

Seyyed Sattar Beheshti
- سید ستار بهشتی
- Born: August 23, 1977; Iran
- Died: November 3, 2012 (aged 35)
- Cause of death: Torture by the Iranian government and police
- Occupation: Iranian blogger

Seyyed Sattar Beheshti (Persian: سید ستار بهشتی) was an Iranian blogger who died under suspicious and unclear circumstances in early November 2012, several days after being arrested by the Iranian Cyber Police unit for criticizing the government of the Islamic Republic on Facebook, and after making a signed complaint of being tortured while in custody. His reported death has drawn international condemnation and led to the dismissal of the commander of Iran's cybercrimes police unit.

== Background of blogger ==
Sattar Beheshti was born in 1977 and lived in Robat Karim, 27 km southwest of Tehran. According to Hamid Dabashi he was "a labourer from a working class family". Opposition websites report that he had been detained in 1999 after student protests at Tehran University.

His website "My Life for My Iran" at magalh91.blogspot.de was not a major blog, and had fewer than 30 viewers in October. But although he "was regarded as a relatively minor figure" among Iran's bloggers, according to the New York Times, Beheshti's death "has provoked outrage among both opponents and supporters of Iran's leaders".

On October 22, 2012, Beheshti posted a criticism of the Islamic Republic on his blog addressed to the Supreme Leader. Beheshti stated that the judicial system of the Islamic Republic was "nothing but a slaughterhouse," and that "the sentences and ... the executions carried out ... were not out of a desire for justice – but were aimed at terrorizing the people so that no one will complain."

In a blog post a day before his arrest, Beheshti wrote: "They threatened me yesterday and said, 'Your mother will soon wear black because you don't shut your big mouth'". Black is worn according to Islamic tradition to commemorate a person who has recently died.

== Prior to death of blogger ==
Prior to death of Mr. Beheshti, President Mahmud Ahmadinejad planned to visit Evin prison on October 7, 2012, but the judiciary officials postponed the visit. on October 20, 2012, Ahmadinejad asked the head of judiciary system Sadeq Amoli-Larijani to facilitate this visit, Larijani rejected the president's request even after Ahmadinejad publicly expressed deep concerns about violation of law and civil rights of prisoners and threatened to fully cut the budget of judiciary system.

Sattar Beheshti died shortly after that on October 30, 2012.

== Arrest and death ==
Beheshti was arrested at his home on October 30 by the Cyberpolice (FATA) for what authorities said were "actions against national security on social networks and Facebook." On October 31 Beheshti "issued an official letter to the head of the prison". The signed, official complaint form was published by the Kalame Web site, stated: "I, Sattar Beheshti, was arrested by FATA and beaten and tortured with multiple blows to my head and body, ... I want to write that if anything happens to me, the police are responsible".

On November 6, authorities "told the blogger's family to collect his body". He reportedly died on November 3.

The week of November 4–10, 41 political prisoners from Ward 350 of Tehran's Evin prison, where Beheshti was reportedly held for one night, issued a letter "claiming that signs of torture were visible on the blogger's body". On November 10, Kaleme published the letter. It read: “Beheshti's body bore signs of torture and that he was beaten during interrogations, repeatedly threatened with death, and hung from his limbs from the ceiling.”

Beheshti is believed to be the 1800th prisoner to have died in custody in the Islamic Republic since 2003.

== Domestic reaction ==
=== Iranian government ===
Following the international outcry, the Iranian government's first official reaction to the incident came on November 11 when Iran's parliament announced that it would probe the circumstances of Beheshti's death. Later on the same day, Iran's judiciary also said it would investigate the matter. On November 13, Abbas Jafari Dolatabadi, Prosecutor-General of Tehran, told reporters that the blogger's case will be sent to the courts for consideration in about 10 days

Official statements on the cause of Beheshti's death have been contradictory. Alaeddin Borujerdi, an "influential member of Parliament" at first denied that Beheshti had been tortured in any way but later told the Tabnak Web site that the blogger had been beaten, but died of shock and fear, not torture.

One of the members of the parliamentary committee investigating Beheshti's death, Javad Karimi Ghoddusi, has suggested foreigners are responsible for the death. Hamid Dashti states Ghodusi claimed that "BBC Persian may have had something to do with" Beheshti's death, or that some of the "political prisoners who had testified publicly that he was tortured may have killed him".

On 1 December, Iranian's national police chief, Ismael Ahmadi-Moqaddam, stated "Tehran's FATA should be held responsible for the death of Sattar Beheshti," and fired General Saeed Shokrian, commander of FATA (the cybercrimes police unit), for negligence in Beheshti's death, according to the Iranian Labor News Agency.

During an interview in 2018, ex-president Mahmoud Ahmadinejad told the story of a national security council session after the death of Sattar Beheshti:

"Regarding Mr. Sattar Beheshti, I shouted at the head of the judiciary system and told him that you committed a crime."

== International condemnation ==
A number of governments and human rights organizations have condemned the Iranian government for Beheshti's death and called for an investigation of the incident.

=== Other countries ===
- (United States) The U.S. State Department called on Iran to investigate the murder of Beheshti: "We are appalled by reports that Iranian authorities tortured and killed blogger and activist Sattar Beheshti during a prison interrogation. Besheshti had been arrested for a crime no greater than expressing his political opinion online. We join the international community in demanding the Iranian government investigate this murder, hold accountable those responsible for Beheshti's arrest, torture, and killing, and immediately cease all reported harassment of Beheshti’s family."
- (France) A French foreign ministry spokesman said that Paris was "profoundly shocked" by the death of Beheshti and called on "the Iranian authorities to shed as much light as possible on the circumstances of his death. The repression of peacefully expressed dissident voices in Iran is unacceptable."
- (Canada) The spokesman for Foreign Affairs Minister John Baird said, "We call upon Iran to immediately clarify his status and treatment. Iran must comply with its domestic and international human rights obligations."

=== Human rights organizations ===
- Amnesty International: "The Iranian authorities must investigate the circumstances that led to the death of a blogger in detention in the capital Tehran... 'Fears that Sattar Beheshti died as a result of torture in an Iranian detention facility, after apparently lodging a complaint about torture are very plausible, given Iran’s track record when it comes to deaths in custody,' said Ann Harrison, Amnesty International’s Deputy Middle East and North Africa Programme Director."
- Committee to Protect Journalists: "Iranian authorities must immediately explain the sudden death of imprisoned blogger Sattar Beheshti, who had previously complained about severe mistreatment in custody... CPJ also demands that the government launch a full investigation into the suspicious death and to immediately halt its intense harassment of the victim's family."
- Reporters Without Borders said it was "deeply shocked to learn of the death... of the netizen Sattar Beheshti. The organization called on "Iranian authorities to clarify the exact circumstances of the netizen’s death" and implored "the international community not to allow this crime to go unpunished."
- Iran Human Rights: "All the reports indicate that Mr. Sattar Beheshti died as a result of torture while he was in detention. Torture is very common during interrogations in Iranian detention centres. The number of prisoners who die under torture is much higher than the numbers reported by the media or human rights organizations. Iranian leaders must be held responsible for the widespread use of torture in Iranian prisons."

== Catherine Ashton meeting with Gohar Eshghi ==
In March 2014 on International Women's Day, Catherine Ashton as EU foreign policy chief visited Gohar Eshghi—mother of Sattar Beheshti—and some other Iranian women activists. This meeting infuriated hardliners in Tehran. Iran warned Austrian embassy over Ashton meeting. Javan newspaper, which is affiliated with the Revolutionary Guard, censored Gohar Esghi's face from a photograph of the meeting. The doctored picture went viral on social media. Later Javan defended its action by saying they "did not want to introduce her as a seditionist". Sadegh Larijani, the head of Iran's judiciary, said "If it is to be that this will continue—trips such as these—and actions to take place against the security interests of the country, the judiciary will take action, and the Foreign Ministry will be responsible for the future consequences."

== See also ==
- Human rights in the Islamic Republic of Iran
- Blogging in Iran
