= Muddy Waters (disambiguation) =

Muddy Waters (born McKinley Morganfield, 1913–1983) was an American blues guitarist and singer.

Muddy Waters may also refer to:

== Music ==
- Muddy Waters (album), a 1996 album by Redman
- "Muddy Waters", a 2015 single by LP from the album Lost on You
- "Muddy Waters", a 2017 song by Nikki Lane from the album Highway Queen

== Other ==
- Muddy Waters (American football) (1923–2006), an American college football coach
- "Muddy Waters" (Baywatch), a 1990 television episode
- "Muddy Waters" (comics), a 1999 Marvel Comics comic book story arc by Fabian Nicieza and Steve Skroce
- Muddy Waters Research, an American stock market research company and investment firm

== See also ==
- Muddy Water (disambiguation)
