= Cyberwarfare and Iran =

Electronic warfare launched by Iranian military forces

Cyberwarfare is a part of the Iranian government's "soft war" military strategy. Being both a victim and wager of cyberwarfare, Iran is considered an emerging military power in the field. Since November 2010, an organization called "The Cyber Defense Command" (Persian: قرارگاه دفاع سایبری; Gharargah-e Defa-e Saiberi) has been operating in Iran under the supervision of the country's "Passive Civil Defense Organization" (Persian: سازمان پدافند غیرعامل; Sazeman-e Padafand-e Gheyr-e Amel) which is itself a subdivision of the Joint Staff of Iranian Armed Forces.

Iran has been the target of cyberattacks, including the Operation Olympic Games (Stuxnet) attack by the United States and Israel on its nuclear facilities.

According to a 2014 report by Institute for National Security Studies, Iran is "one of the most active players in the international cyber arena". In 2013, a Revolutionary Guards general stated that Iran has "the 4th biggest cyber power among the world's cyber armies." According to a 2021 report by a cyber-security company, "Iran is running two surveillance operations in cyber-space, targeting more than 1,000 dissidents". As of 2024, Iran's cyber activities have advanced, particularly in their precision and intelligence-gathering capabilities, allowing for more accurate and targeted attacks against Israel. Following directives from Iran's supreme leader Ali Khamenei after the 7 October attacks, cyber operations expanded, including joint efforts with Hezbollah. Despite these advances, Iran's cyber capabilities still fall short of Israel's, with Iranian hackers' skills being likened to those of mid-level organized crime gangs. However, Israeli officials remain concerned that Iran could rapidly enhance its capabilities, particularly through potential cooperation with Russia. Iranian cyberwarfare targeted the United States during the 2026 Iran war, with researchers noting that Iran's capabilities were more advanced and aggressive during this period.

== Background ==
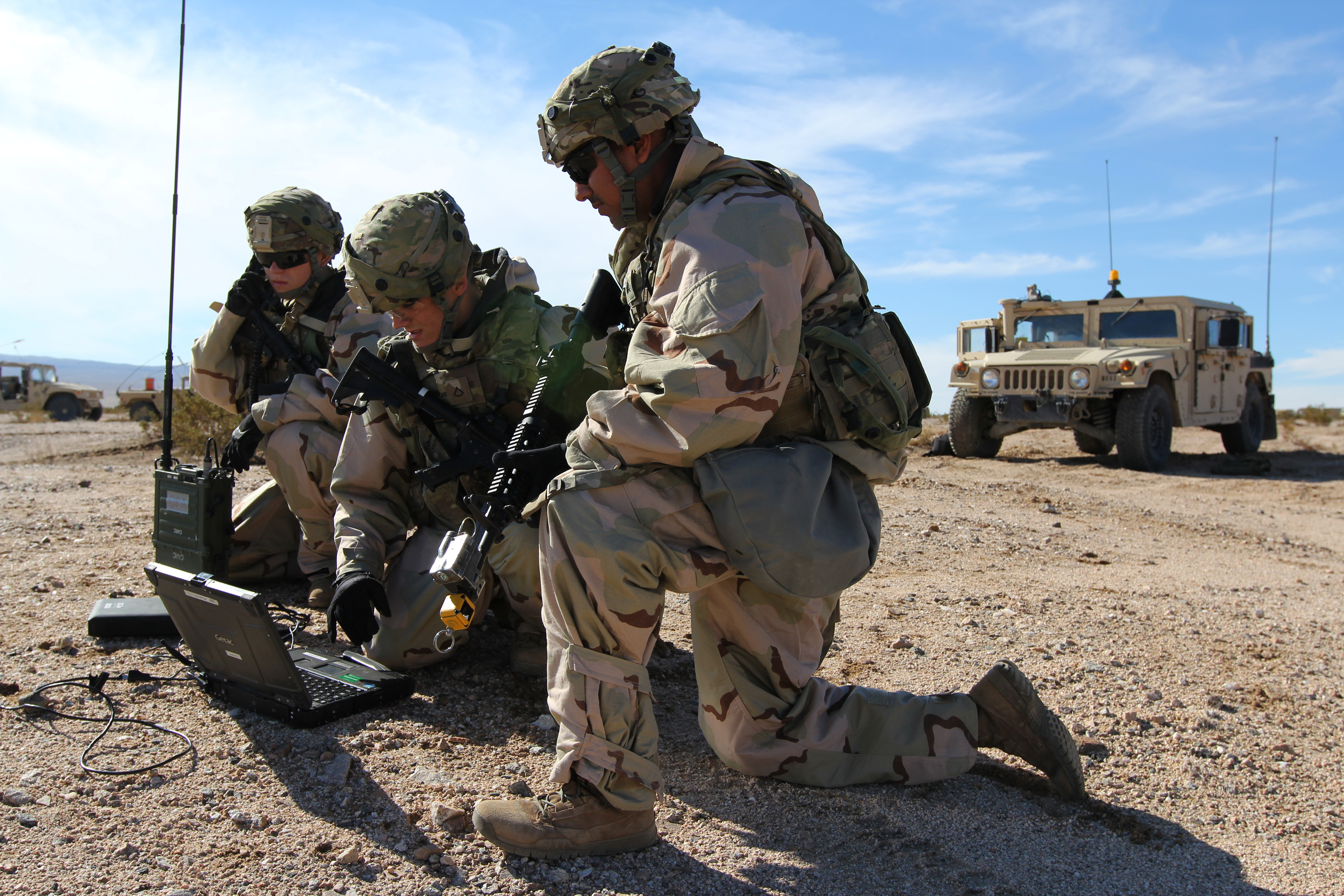
Cyberwarfare specialists of the United States Army's 782nd Military Intelligence Battalion (Cyber) supporting the 3rd Brigade Combat Team, 1st Cavalry Division during a training exercise in 2019

Cyberwarfare is the use of cyberattacks against an enemy state, causing comparable harm to traditional warfare. Some intended outcomes could be espionage, sabotage, propaganda, manipulation, or economic warfare.

Many countries, including the United States, United Kingdom, Russia, China, Israel, Iran, India, and North Korea, have active cyber capabilities for offensive and defensive operations. As states explore the use of cyber operations and combine capabilities, the likelihood of physical confrontation and violence playing out as a result of, or part of, a cyber operation is increased. However, meeting the scale and protracted nature of war is unlikely, thus ambiguity remains.

There has been significant debate among experts regarding the definition of cyberwarfare, and even if such a thing exists. One view is that the term is a misnomer, since no cyberattack to date could be described as a war. An alternative view is that it is a suitable label for cyberattacks that cause physical damage to people and objects in the real world.

The first instance of kinetic military action used in response to a cyberattack resulting in the loss of human life was observed on 5 May 2019, when the Israel Defense Forces targeted and destroyed a building associated with an cyberattack.

== Attacks against Iran ==
In June 2010, Iran was the victim of a cyber-attack when its nuclear facility in Natanz was infiltrated by the cyber-worm 'Stuxnet'. A combined effort by the United States and Israel, Stuxnet destroyed perhaps over 1,000 nuclear centrifuges and, according to a Business Insider article, "[set] Tehran's atomic programme back by at least two years." The worm spread beyond the plant to allegedly infect over 60,000 computers, but the government of Iran indicates it caused no significant damage. Iran crowdsourced solutions to the worm and is purportedly now better positioned in terms of cyber warfare technology. No government claimed responsibility for the worm. The cyber-worm was also used against North Korea.

=== NIN ===
Iranian cyber defense system – digital fortress part of national information network (national internet) – is developed for thwarting attacks and engaging attackers. In November 2022, the Iranian Majlis Islamic Consultative Assembly recommended a Passive Defence Incorporation.

=== Events ===
- In October 2013, media reported Mojtaba Ahmadi, who served as commander of the "Cyber War Headquarters" was found dead wounded by bullets in Karaj.
- November 2018: The Iranian telecommunication minister Mohammad-Javad Azari Jahromi accuses Israel of a failed cyberattack on its telecommunications infrastructure, and vows to respond with legal action.
- October 2021: An attack paralyzed gas stations across the country, preventing users from purchasing fuel using state-issued cards and digital billboards displaying anti-government messages
- In September, October and November 2022, Iranian state networks and emails came under attack by Anonymous and other hacking groups acting in solidarity with Iranian protestors.
- In the year 2023 several government ministries were fully hacked by multiple people including Ministry of Science research and technology on 23 September. Veterans affairs Ministry of foreign affairs(50TB) Central Insurance and 19 subsidiary corporations(119 million lines records) City of Tehran municipality, State news bulletin National Civil Registration vital records organization database(20TB) Atomic Energy Organization Presidency Ridesharing company Tapsi was hacked as well.
- December 2023 seventy percent of entire national Iranian fuel pumps taken out, Predators Sparrow took responsibility
- January 2024 Snapp was hacked with records of 80 million Iranians along with payment info sold.
- In 2024 February
  - Islamic Consultative Assembly was hacked revealing massive payment to members.
  - Russian hackers attacked Iranian embassy.
  - 3000000 court penal cases of Iranian Judicial system hacked and put online.
  - Anonymous reportedly extracted 14 GB of data out of a Malek-Ashtar University of Technology server belonging to Ministry of Defense.
  - US military attacked two Iranian intelligence vessels at Red Sea.
- In May 2024
  - Iran was targeted with huge scale cyberattacks causing internet issues
- In June 2024
  - Islamic culture and guidance's ministry Haj.ir taken out, source code and database hacked by IRleaks team, it included pilgrim and civil travel records since 1980s
  - Ministry of Science hacked.
- IRLeaks attack on Iranian banks
- October Israeli cyberattacks on nuclear facilities
- 10000 documents and emails related to oil smuggling and corruption leaked by Anonymous.
- In April 2025 Iranian hackers used MURKYTOUR malware in social engineering attack campaign in Israel.

== June 2025 – Post-war ==
During the Twelve-Day War, phones belonging to drivers and bodyguards of IRGC commanders were hacked by Israel. Iran disabled GPS signal access by jamming it from the 12 June.

Since June 2025, cloudflare radar recorded that Iran ordered at least 8 separate internet blackouts nationwide in Iran throughout 2025.

Iran also set up a law to enforce the capital death penalty punishment for connecting to and using the internet via SpaceX Starlink satellite broadband technology.

In September, Iran executed Iranian database expert for reason of espionage on behalf of Israel.

In December a hacker sold leaked data belonging to more than 69 million Iranian citizens including full names, birthday, national id, postal code & address, and phone number.

== 2026 Iran war ==
During the 2026 Iran war, the service of two Iranian banks, Bank Sepah and Melli Bank, both with ties to the Iranian Government and the IRGC, were reportedly disrupted.

Iranian cyberwarfare directly targeted the United States during the war, with researchers stating that Iran's cyberwarfare capabilities were more advanced and aggressive during the conflict.

== June 2026 Iranian banks hack ==
Since 13 June 2026, four largest Iranian banks that were being serviced by National Informatics Corporation were taken out and gone for weeks. Banks Melli, Saderat, Tejarat, Tose Saderat for over nine days. On 2 June, National security commissioner called for restoring cyber security to the country. Iranian Central Bank denied they were deliberately sabotaging their own government banks with disruption. Banks offered little response to public. Central bank also failed to conduct global subsidiy payment to public.

== Attacks against the United States ==
Several media outlets and ex NSA chief accused the Iranian government of conducting cyber sabotage/espionage attacks on water plants in the United States, including in New Jersey.

== Attacks by Iran ==
The Iranian government has been accused by Western analysts of its own cyber-attacks against the United States, Israel and Persian Gulf Arab countries, but denied this, including specific allegations of 2012 involvement in hacking into American banks. The conflict between Iran and the United States has been called "history's first known cyber-war" by Michael Joseph Gross in mid-2013.

=== 2010–2020 ===
- August 2014: An IDF official told the press that Iran has launched numerous significant attacks against Israel's Internet infrastructure.
- 31 March 2015: There was a massive power outage for 12 hours in 44 of 81 provinces of Turkey, holding 40 million people. Istanbul and Ankara were among the places suffering blackouts. According to Observer.com, Iranian hackers, possibly the Iranian Cyber Army, were behind the power outage.
- (United Kingdom) June 2017: The Daily Telegraph reported that intelligence officials concluded that Iran was responsible for a cyberattack on the British Parliament lasting 12 hours that compromised around 90 email accounts of MPs. The motive for the attack is unknown but experts suggested that the Islamic Revolutionary Guard Corps could be using cyberwarfare to undermine the Iran nuclear deal.
- (United States) November 2020: CISA reported an Iranian group obtained private voter registration data, for the purposes of voter intimidation.

=== 2022 ===
- January 2022: The website of Israel's Jerusalem Post newspaper and the Twitter account of Maariv newspaper are hacked by suspected Iranian hackers. The website's content was replaced with a threat to target the Shimon Peres Negev Nuclear Research Center, and an apparent reference to Qasem Soleimani who was assassinated exactly two years earlier in Baghdad, Iraq.
- March 2022: Large-scale cyberattacks were launched against multiple Israeli government websites, allegedly by Iran as retaliation for failed Mossad operations, though neither the attack attribution nor the purported Mossad operations could be confirmed as of March 2022. The National Cyber Directorate declared a state of emergency as a result of the attacks and unnamed defense sources told media outlets it was possibly the largest-ever cyberattack against Israel.
- (Albania) November 2022: Iranian hackers attacked Albanian networks.
- (United States) November: Seventeen American networks system were turned into mining crypto because of existing undefended vulnerability.

=== 2023 ===
- Moneybird ransomware was used by Agrius against Israeli people. Cyberattack on Israeli university was blamed on Iranian ministry of intelligence. Attacks attributed to Iranians targeted Israeli ports and Haifa harbors.
- Disinformation en masse sponsored by state targeted Iranians in 2023.
- In August 2023, Germany's Federal Office for the Protection of the Constitution reported that hackers linked to Iran's Islamic Revolutionary Guard Corps targeted opponents of the Iranian government in Germany, using fake identities to conduct cyber espionage.
- Sophos and Zimperium report Iranian citizens credentials hacked by Iranian hackers, with Firebase, C2 (C&C) iOS, Android malware apps called Bank Saderat, Central Bank and Bank Mellat.
- In November 2023, Ziv Hospital in Safed, Israel, reported a cyber breach of its computer systems. An Iranian-linked hacking group subsequently claimed to have obtained 500 gigabytes of patient information.
- In late November 2023, the Municipal Water Authority of Aliquippa, Pennsylvania experienced a cyberattack by pro-Iran hackers who breached its industrial equipment, including a system managing water pressure.
- In December 2023, a cyberattack by hackers linked to Iran disrupted the water supply in a rural area of County Mayo, Ireland, leaving about 160 households without water for two days.
- 14 December 2023 ESET documented OilRig group which is state sponsored use C&C attacks.

=== 2024 ===
- In February 2024, OpenAI announced that it had shut down accounts used by the Crimson Sandstorm hacking group. The group had been using OpenAI services to research evasion techniques, write and refactor code, and create phishing campaign content.
- April 2024 Israel secrets published by Iranian website,
- In June 2024, Iranian-backed hackers, identified as Mint Sandstorm (also known as Charming Kitten or APT35), targeted a high-ranking official from a U.S. presidential campaign with a spear-phishing attack. The hackers used a compromised email account to send a malicious link.
- In July 2024, MuddyWater, an advanced persistent threat group, increased cyber attacks in the Middle East.
- On 9 August 2024, Microsoft reported that Iran has intensified its interference in the US elections by launching fake news sites and conducting hacking attempts. According to a Washington Post report, Iranian-operated news networks, such as Nio Thinker and Savannah Time, aim to polarize American voters by promoting extreme viewpoints. Microsoft also detailed a spear-phishing attack conducted by Iranian hackers targeting a US presidential campaign. This group used a compromised email account to attempt unauthorized access to sensitive information. Another Iranian group also managed to breach an account belonging to a county government employee in a swing state.
- In September 2024, U.S. authorities revealed that Iranian hackers had accessed and distributed stolen information from Trump's campaign to individuals linked to Biden's re-election effort, aiming to disrupt the election. Despite Iran's denial of involvement, officials suggested the intent was to erode public confidence in the electoral process.
- Also in September 2024, Swedish authorities revealed that a cyber group called Anzu, operating under Iran's Islamic Revolutionary Guard Corps (IRGC), were responsible for hacking into a Swedish text messaging service in July 2023, taking over passwords, usernames and other tools, and sending thousands of messages calling Swedes "demons" and bearing instructions to exact vengeance upon Koran burners. Iran denied the accusation, though the investigation by the Swedish Prosecution Authority managed to identify the individual hackers responsible for the data breach. In a statement by Justice Minister Gunnar Stromme it was said that the goal was to destabilise Sweden or increase polarisation, and the security service warned that Iran is among those seeking to create division and bolster its own government.

On 30 October FBI and Treasury released a cybsecurity threat advisory related in relation to Emennet Passargad.

In November 2024 ClearSky revealed an Iranian "dream job malware" APT TA455 doing an op using North Korean shared methods targeting US defence sector.

Iranian state-sponsored hackers, identified as TA455 (also known as APT35 and Charming Kitten), have been conducting a cyber espionage campaign targeting the aerospace industry since September 2023, using tactics similar to those of North Korean threat actors. The campaign involves creating fake recruiter profiles on LinkedIn and using malicious domains to lure victims into downloading malware known as SnailResin. Victims are enticed to open ZIP files disguised as job-related documents, which have a low antivirus detection rate. The malware is deployed through DLL side-loading attacks, closely mirroring techniques used by North Korean hackers. Researchers suggest that the Iranian hackers may have adopted these methods from North Korea, particularly given the malware's initial association with North Korean groups like Kimsuky and Lazarus. TA455 employs Cloudflare to obscure its command-and-control domains and encodes command and control data on GitHub to blend in with legitimate web traffic, making tracking their infrastructure difficult. The primary targets of this campaign are aerospace professionals, with the goal of infiltrating networks within the aerospace, aviation, and defense sectors, particularly in the Middle East, including Israel, the United Arab Emirates, and potentially Turkey, India, and Albania. The goal appears to be espionage and data exfiltration from these high-value targets in the aerospace sector.

The United Kingdom and United States have jointly issued a warning about ongoing spear-phishing attacks conducted by cyber actors affiliated with Iran's Islamic Revolutionary Guard Corps (IRGC). These sophisticated attacks target individuals connected to Iranian and Middle Eastern affairs, including government officials, think tank personnel, journalists, activists, and those involved in US political campaigns. The attackers use social engineering techniques to impersonate trusted contacts, aiming to gain access to victims' personal and business accounts. They often use fraudulent login pages to obtain credentials, allowing them to access sensitive information and manipulate email accounts. The National Cyber Security Centre (NCSC) and its US counterparts are urging at-risk individuals to follow mitigation steps and utilize free cyber defence services to protect themselves. Paul Chichester, NCSC Director of Operations, emphasized the persistent nature of this threat and the importance of remaining vigilant, particularly for those in sensitive sectors.

December

- FBI's Donald Trump appointment director Kash Patel successfully hacked.
- Cotton Sandstorm : Meta reported that they had successfully detected and taken down 48 accounts belonging to IRGC posing as anti west activists part of an influence op

=== March 2025 ===
LabDookhtegan launched a cyberattack against Iranian oil rigs, jamming their communications and electronic guidance systems, while disrupting the satellite network connectivity of 116 ships.

Codebreakers hackers released entire database records of bank Sepah from up to 1925.

Iranians hacked public announcement speakers from an Israeli kindergarten. On 30 January, Iranians failed to hack Gemini accounts product of Google.

In February, Minister of intelligence hacked 2 terabytes of data from Israeli police.

In March, a 30,000-node DDoS botnet originating in Iran was discovered.

- Thirty million users of Mobile Communications of Iran were hacked.

=== April 2025 ===
In April, the Iranian government reported a cyber attack on its infrastructure.

=== May 2025 ===
Unit 42 discovered an Iranian APT35 sponsored fake German Mega Model Agency fashion modeling website collecting user data on behalf of fake AI generated identity Shir Benzion.

In 14 May, Prana group hack revealed masked identity of Majiz Azami, owner of Sepeher Energy Jahan and its subsidiary Energy Hamta Pars, a front company for Iranian Armed Forces Staff to be using Qatari's help to smuggle 65 million barrels of oil worth $4.2bn. The company was incorporated in Tehran in November 2022.

In 30 May, Meta reported that it taken out Iranian influence operations.

Iranian man Sina Qolinejas pleaded guilty to helping ransomware attack on City of Baltimore.

=== June 2025 ===
ESET reported they have had tracked a malware attack against Iraqi and Iraqi Kurdistan government targets attributed to oilrig subcluster.

=== March 2026 ===
In March 2026, an Iran-linked hacking group known as Handala claimed responsibility for breaching the personal email account of FBI Director Kash Patel and publishing the emails and personal data online.

=== June 2026 ===
Since 13 June four 4 Iranian govt major banks Tejarat, Saderat, Tosee Saderat, Meli were hacked and locked.

Handala affiliates attacked Bakersfield, California water system.

Albanian Prime Minister reported several cyberattacks against coastal development backed by Kushner.

Blackshadow targeted middle east infrastructure with cyber sabotage.

The Iranian government attempted to job recruit for espionage from oil companies and aviation companies.

=== July 2026 ===
A preliminary report recorded the potential responsibility of Iranian hackers for a cyberattack on many municipal water systems in Minnesota in July 2026.

=== August 2026 ===
In August 2026, the U.S. Department of Justice announced new and updated charges against 17 individuals for conducting hacks and data theft ‌for the Islamic Revolutionary Guard Corps and other Iranian government and academic clients against U.S. universities, companies, and government agencies. The DOJ alleged that the individuals worked with the Mabna Institute during hacking campaigns.

A small British power plant was shut down by Iranian hackers for days.

== 2026 French supermarket refrigerator hack ==
On 9 November, France's ANSSI attributed a first-of-its-kind, large-scale sabotage cyberattack on 12 October—which spoiled food by spiking temperatures at 700 supermarkets—to Iran's IRGC-affiliated Shahid Kaveh group, adding that it found links to another IRGC cyber unit, Shahid Shoostari, to multiple French cyberattacks since 2020, including those targeting the Charlie Hebdo newspaper in 2023 and the 2024 Summer Olympics.

== SSL root certificate ==
In September 2026, the Iranian government started forcing installations of global root certificates, with their government banks having to switch to new domain names addresses.

== Cyberpolice ==
In October 2026, Iran's FARAJA started constant surveillance of over 160000 thousand corporations and online platforms to deter threat as well as being on hand having access to be able to handle cyber attack emergency situations. The police also shutdown major exchanges against falling and collapse of Iranian rial value against US dollar.

== Command and control ==
Iranian armed forces install malware apps for espionage on Android phones. According to Microsoft, they could steal victims identity.

== Alog ==
The IRGC on 12 September 2026 announced Alog to track and monitor social media network of those Non-Iranians and foreigners and people abroad that actively oppose the government and confiscate their belongings and property.

== AI Identity theft ==
On 28th August 2026 Axios reported Iranian government psyops affiliated hackers used AI to impersonate Americans on Meta disinformation campaign. Dept of State offered 10$ million bounty for information leading to indictment of hackers Fateme Sadiqi and Mohamed Shirinkar.

== Arrests ==
On 1 August 2026, the FBI arrested Amir "Kinglet" Barati, an Iranian-Turkish black hat hacker allegedly affiliated with the Iranian government, in Montenegro during his vacation there.

== Suspended Iranian accounts ==
On 5 May 2020, Reuters reported, quoting a monthly Facebook report, that Iranian state-run media had targeted hundreds of fake social media accounts to covertly spread pro-Iranian messaging, online since at least 2011, for secretly broadcasting online promotional messages in favor of Iran in order targeting voters in countries including Britain and the United States. Accounts were suspended for coordinated inauthentic behavior, which removed eight networks in recent weeks, including one with links to the Islamic Republic of Iran Broadcasting.

== See also ==
- Islamic Revolutionary Guards Corps Cyber Security Command
- Ashiyane
- List of cyber warfare forces
- Iranian Cyber Army
- Iran Cyber Police
- Communications in Iran
- Monica Witt
- Hybrid warfare against Iran
- Iran Mission Center
- Iranian external operations#Online

Alleged operations and malware against Iran

- Operation Olympic Games
- Stuxnet
- Flame
- Duqu
- Stars virus

Alleged operations and malware by Iran

- Foreign interference in the 2020 United States elections
- Iranian influence operations in the United Kingdom
- Mahdi
- Shamoon
- Operation Ababil
- Operation Newscaster
- Operation Cleaver
- Yemen Cyber Army
- Syrian Electronic Army
