= Behrooz Kamalian =

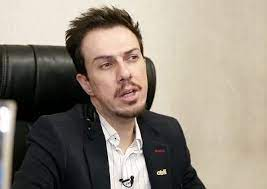
- Born: 1983 (age 42–43); Tehran, Iran

Behrooz Kamalian (Persian: بهروز کمالیان), also known as "Behrooz_Ice", is the founder and CEO of Ashiyane. On the 10 October 2011

== Professional life ==
=== Ashiyane ===
Behrouz Kamalian founded Ashianeh cyber security group (in Persian: Ashianeh means nest) with the help of Nima Salehi aka Q7x and some of his friends in 2001 and became its CEO. Ashianeh is the oldest cyber group in Iran, which was initially started with the aim of training users. But gradually its activities became politicized to the extent that its members are said to be active members of Iran's cyber army. According to Kamalian, Ashianeh has also provided services to Iran's military and government organizations. 9 10 11 1213

It appears that Behrooz Kamalian has deep relations with the Iranian government. The research group Insikt Group states, "Ashiyane was one of the only hacking forums that remained," and according to an Insikt Group source, the Iranian hacking community speculated that Kamalian had made a deal with the Iranian government to provide exclusive services in the cybersecurity field to the government.

On August 5, 2018, Ashiyane suddenly disappeared without any explanation. Some have speculated that Behrooz Kamalian was arrested and imprisoned, but if this is true, he was released in mid-November, as a video posted on Instagram on November 8 shows an Iranian actor thanking Kamalian for restoring access to his Instagram account. It appears that Kamalian is currently attempting to rebuild his reputation, now as a white-hat hacker who helps celebrities.

=== Other activities ===
After the closure of Ashiyane and Kamalian's efforts to rebrand his activities, Levi Gundert of the Insikt Group told SecurityWeek that Kamalian may still be involved in more malicious activities under a different name, and in that case, Western intelligence agencies will eventually identify him. Gundert was previously a special agent for the Secret Service and FBI and is currently the vice president of Intelligence and Risk at Recorded Future.

Currently, Kamalian manages the Behteam agency.

== Human rights violations and sanctions by the European Union ==
On October 10, 2011, the European Union placed Behrooz Kamalian on the list of human rights sanctions due to the role that some Iranian officials, including Kamalian, played in the widespread and severe violation of the rights of Iranian citizens. According to these sanctions, Kamalian is banned from entering EU member states, and all his assets in Europe will be seized. According to the EU statement, Behrooz Kamalian was responsible for extensive cyberattacks on domestic and foreign opponents and hacking news websites.
