= Plan X =

DARPA program

Plan X is a Defense Advanced Research Projects Agency (DARPA) program, which seeks to develop a defensive platform for the Department of Defense to plan for, conduct, and assess cyberwarfare in a manner similar to kinetic warfare. Towards this end, the program will bridge cyber communities of interest from academe, to the defense industrial base, to the commercial tech industry, to user-experience experts.

Plan X will not develop cyber offensive technologies or effects. National policymakers, not DARPA, will determine how the cyber capabilities developed under Plan X will be employed to serve the national security interests of the United States.

Specifically, the Plan X program to integrate the cyber battlespace concepts of the network map, operational unit, and capability set in the planning, execution, and measurement phases of military cyber operations. To achieve this goal, the Plan X system will be developed as an open platform architecture for integration with government and industry technologies.

The Plan X program is explicitly not funding research and development efforts in cyberweapon-related technologies such as vulnerability analysis, command and control protocols, or end effects.
