= Cyberstrategy 3.0 =

Cyberstrategy 3.0 is the United States information warfare strategy against cyberwarfare. This strategy uses deterrence based on making infrastructure robust and redundant enough to survive any Internet cyber attack. A good example of this concept can be seen in action in a cyber strategy game like CyberStratG.

.
