= Ashiyane =

Ashyiane Forum (Persian: آشیانه meaning hangar) or Ashiyane Digital Security team was a hacker forum in Iran, founded by Behrooz Kamalian in 2002. It had direct ties to Iran's Islamic Revolutionary Guards Corps. The forum was shut down in 2018. In 2021 it was back to cyberspace.
