= Iranian Cyber Police =

Unit of the Islamic Republic of Iran police

Iranian Cyber Police پلیس فضای تولید و تبادل اطلاعات ایران
- Abbreviation: FATA

Agency overview
- Formed: January 23, 2011

Jurisdictional structure
- Operations jurisdiction: Islamic Republic of Iran

Operational structure
- Agency executive: 2nd Brigadier General Vahid Majid

Website
- cyberpolice.ir/en

The Iranian Cyber Police (Persian: پلیس فضای تولید و تبادل اطلاعات ایران, Polis-e Faza-ye Tolid vâ Tabadol-e Etelâ'at-e Iran, lit. The Police for the Sphere of the Production and Exchange of Information, also known as FATA Persian: فتا) is a unit of the Islamic Republic of Iran Police, founded in January 2011.

== Inauguration ==
In 2009, Iran's Police Chief Brigadier General Esmail Ahmadi-Moqaddam announced plans to set up a cyber police division to counter "internet crimes".

On January 23, 2011, Iran's Cyber Police (FATA) unit was launched with Brigadier General Kamal Hadianfar as the head of the new force. At the inaugural ceremony, Police Chief Esmail Ahmadi-Moqaddam said the unit was now operational in Tehran and that by the end of the Iranian year, police stations throughout the country would have their cyber units. According to Agence France-Presse, Ahmadi-Moqaddam said: "The cyber police would take on anti-revolutionary and dissident groups who used Internet-based social networks in 2009 to trigger protests against the re-election of President Mahmoud Ahmadinejad."

== Activities ==
In January 2012, the cyber police issued new guidelines for Internet cafés, requiring users to provide personal information that would be kept by café owners for six months, and a record of the websites they visited. The rules also require café owners to install closed-circuit television cameras and maintain the recordings for six months. The cyber police stated the measures are being implemented because "citizens are concerned about information theft." According to Golnaz Esfandiari of Radio Free Europe/Radio Liberty, however, the new rules "will also create a logbook that authorities can use to track down activists or whoever is deemed a threat to national security."

The same month, the cyber police arrested four administrators of a Facebook group that had launched an online beauty competition. The cyber police chief announced the group had been "destroyed" for spreading corruption and immorality.

In June 2012, Iranian media reported that the cyber police would launch a crackdown on virtual private networks (VPNs), which many Iranians use to circumvent the government's Internet censorship.

== Social media purge ==
On the internet websites they monitor for Iranians and businesses that are running illegally including gymclubs, body sculpting plastic surgery and modeling they also call and indict users.

== Death of Sattar Beheshti ==
On October 30, 2012, the cyber police arrested 35-year-old Sattar Beheshti for "actions against national security on social networks and Facebook." Beheshti had criticized the Iranian government in his blog. Beheshti was found dead in his prison cell on November 3, and was believed to have been tortured to death by the cyber police authorities.

The death of Beheshti sparked international condemnation and "generated a rare torrent of criticism from officials" in Iran. Iranian parliament member Mehdi Davatgari charged that the cyber police had held Beheshti illegally overnight without a court order and called for the "resignation or dismissal of the cyber police chief." On December 1, 2012, the chief of Tehran's cyber police unit, Mohammad Hassan Shokrian, was dismissed over the death of Beheshti for "failures and weaknesses in adequately supervising personnel under his supervision."

== See also ==
- Iranian Cyber Army
- IRGC Cooperation Bonyad
- Nuclear Protection and Security Corps
