= Paola Vega Castillo =

Costa Rican government official

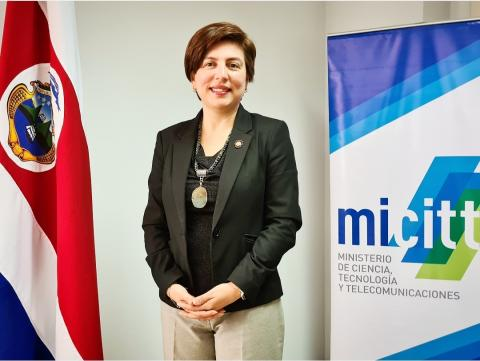

Minister of Science, Innovation, Technology and Telecommunications
- President: Carlos Alvarado Quesada
- Deputy: Federico Torres Carballo
- Incumbent
- Assumed office 1 June 2020

Vice Minister of Science and Technology
- In office 8 May 2018 – 1 June 2020

Personal details
- Education: Technical University of Hamburg

Paola Vega Castillo is the Minister of Science, Innovation, Technology and Telecommunications of Costa Rica. Prior to her appointment as Minister of Science, Innovation, Technology and Telecommunications in June 2020, Vega Castillo was in the same ministry as Vice Minister of Science and Technology since May 2018.

Prior to her political career, Vega Castillo was a professor at the Technological Institute of Costa Rica. She obtained her doctorate at the Technical University of Hamburg in Microelectronics.
