= 2016 Indian bank data breach =

Data breach of Indian banks

The 2016 Indian bank data breach was reported in October 2016. It was estimated that 3.2 million debit cards were compromised. Major Indian banks, among them SBI, HDFC Bank, ICICI, YES Bank and Axis Bank, were among the worst hit. The breach went undetected for months and was first detected after several banks reported fraudulent use of their customers’ cards in China and the United States, while these customers were in India.

This resulted in one of the India's biggest card replacement drives in banking history. State Bank of India, announced the blocking and replacement of almost 600,000 debit cards.

An audit performed by SISA Information Security reports that the breach was due to malware injected into the payment gateway network of Hitachi Payment Systems.

== See also ==
- 2016 Bangladesh Bank heist
- List of cyber-attacks
- Data breaches in India
