= Teodoro Willink Castro =

Costa Rican government official

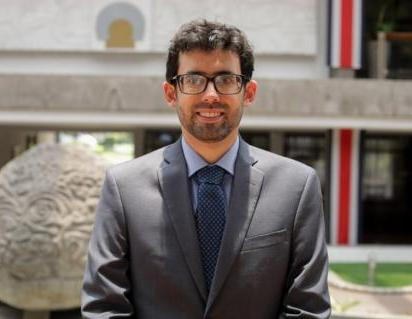

Vice Minister of Telecommunications
- President: Carlos Alvarado Quesada
- Incumbent
- Assumed office 7 September 2020

Personal details
- Education: University of Twente

Teodoro Willink Castro is the Vice Minister of Telecommunications of Costa Rica (in the Ministry of Science, Innovation, Technology and Telecommunications). Before his appointment as Vice Minister, he was Interim Professor at the University of Costa Rica. His research on cubesats was published by IEEE.

== Education ==
Willink Castro has a master's degree in Telecommunications Engineering from the Technical University of Twente and a Licentiate. He also holds bachelor's degree in Electrical, Electronic and Communications Engineering from the University of Costa Rica.
