= Cyxymu =

Cyxymu is a screen name of a Georgian blogger who was targeted in a co-ordinated series of attacks on social networking sites Facebook, Google Blogger, LiveJournal and Twitter, taking the latter offline for two hours on August 7, 2009. The name mimics a Cyrillic spelling of Sukhumi (Сухуми), capital town in the Georgian breakaway region of Abkhazia. The blogger, who extensively covers the suffering of Georgian civilians during and after the War in Abkhazia, accuses Russia of trying to silence him using cyberattacks. Facebook came out in defense of Cyxymu, with chief security officer Max Kelly stating that "It was a simultaneous attack across a number of properties targeting him to keep his voice from being heard."

== Before the 2009 attack ==
Cyxymu's Russian-language LiveJournal blog was a source of information from Georgia for the news media during the 2007 state of emergency and 2008 Russo-Georgian War.

Cyxymu's LJ blog had previously been targeted by denial-of-service attacks in October 2008, rendering the LiveJournal servers unavailable three times during October 26–27. The attack on Cyxymu is internationally seen as part of an ongoing cyberwar between Russia and Georgia.

== See also ==
- Cyberattacks during the Russo-Georgian War
