= BigBasket =

Indian online grocery delivery company

- Type: Subsidiary
- Industry: E-commerce; Online shopping Q-commerce
- Founded: October 2011; 15 years ago
- Founders: V. S. Sudhakar; Hari Menon; V. S. Ramesh; Vipul Parekh; Abhinay Choudhari
- Headquarters: Bengaluru, Karnataka, India
- Area served: India
- Key people: Hari Menon (CEO); Vipul Parekh (CFO)
- Services: Online grocer
- Revenue: ▲₹10,100 crore (US$1.0 billion) (FY24)
- Net income: ▼₹−1,415 crore (US$−150 million) (FY24)
- Parent: Tata Digital
- Divisions: BB Daily; BB Instant; BB Now
- Website: bigbasket.com

BigBasket is an Indian online grocer, headquartered in Bengaluru and owned by Tata Digital. The company was set up in 2011 and is registered with the name Supermarket Grocery Supplies Pvt. Ltd. As of January 2023, it operates in more than 30 cities in India.

== History ==
BigBasket was founded in December 2011 by five entrepreneurs from the dot-com crash era. It received its initial funding of $10 million from Bengaluru-based private equity investor Ascent Capital.

In 2015, Bigbasket acquired the hyperlocal delivery company Delyver to build its last-mile delivery network. By mid-2016, BigBasket was operating in eight large Indian cities and had grown to become India's biggest e-grocer.

In early 2018, China's Alibaba Group led a $300 million funding round at a valuation of around $950 million. By May 2019, BigBasket was operating across 25 Indian cities, and became a 'unicorn' (a startup valued at more than $1 billion) after raising $150 million in a new funding round led by Mirae Asset-Naver Asia Growth Fund, the CDC Group, and Alibaba.

In October 2020, BigBasket suffered a data breach exposing the data of more than 20 million users, which included email, IP and physical addresses, names, phones numbers, dates of birth and passwords.

Demand for online grocery shopping increased considerably in the wake of the COVID-19 pandemic and by the start of 2022, BigBasket was processing over 7 million orders per month.

In May 2021, Tata Group subsidiary Tata Digital acquired a 64% majority stake in BigBasket at a valuation of around $1.85 billion. On 24 November 2021, BigBasket opened its first physical store in Bengaluru, branded 'Fresho', primarily for the sale of fresh fruits and vegetables.

In January 2023, BigBasket received a $200 million funding from investors, including majority shareholder Tata Digital, at a valuation of $3.2 billion.

According to CEO Vipul Parekh, over one-third of the company's revenue comes from its private label products.

In June 2025, BigBasket launched a 10-minute food delivery service in Bengaluru. The service included offerings from Tata Starbucks and Qmin, a food platform by Indian Hotels Company Limited.

In October 2026, Bigbasket expanded its staple food offerings through a distribution partnership with GRM Foods Pvt. Ltd. to retail its flagship product, 921 Basmati Rice. The agreement added to the brand's existing quick-commerce availability across platforms including Zepto, Swiggy, Instamart, Blinkit, and Amazon.

== See also ==
- Tata Neu
- E-commerce in India
