= Paula Bogantes Zamora =

Costa Rican business administrator and politician (born 1973)

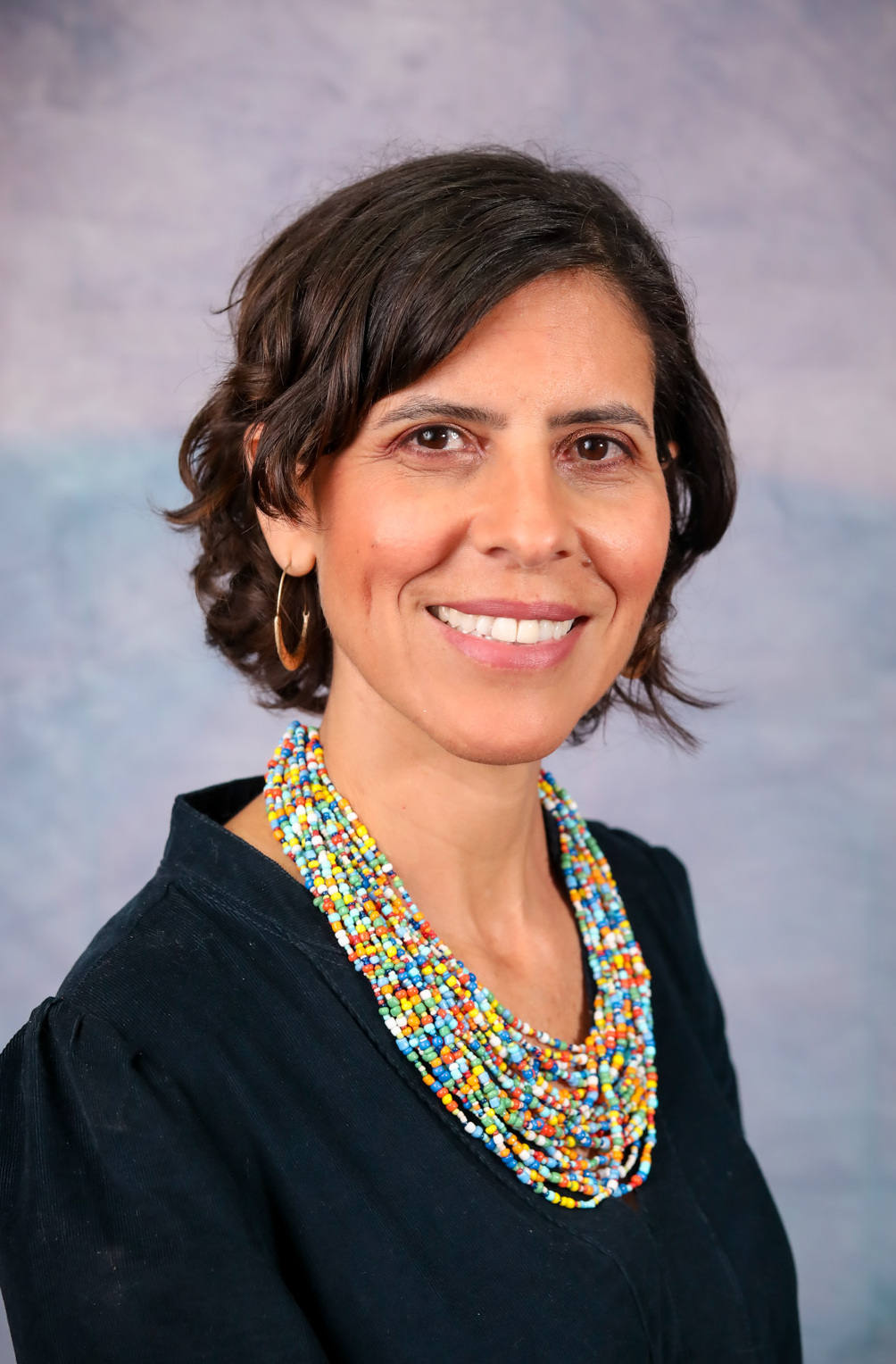
- Official portrait, 2023

Minister of Science, Innovation, Technology and Telecommunications
- Incumbent
- Assumed office 14 April 2023
- President: Rodrigo Chaves Robles
- Preceded by: Alvarado Briceño

Personal details
- Born: 24 July 1973 (age 53)
- Education: LEAD University; Georgetown University; International University of the Americas; Massachusetts Institute of Technology

Paula Bogantes Zamora (born 24 July 1973) is a Costa Rican business administrator and politician, current Minister of Science, Innovation, Technology and Telecommunications of Costa Rica since 2023. She previously served as Vice Minister of Vice Minister of Foreign Trade.

== Early life and education ==
Bogantes was born on 24 July 1973. She earned a bachelor's degree in business administration from the International University of the Americas, a master's degree in international trade and markets from LEAD University, a certificate in organizational leadership from Georgetown University, and a diploma in digital transformation from the Massachusetts Institute of Technology.

== Career ==
Bogantes has extensive experience in the private sector in the areas of competitiveness, innovation, attracting foreign investment, and technology. She served as a consultant at the Inter-American Development Bank, as a manager at the Costa Rican Coalition for Development Initiatives, and was appointed Vice Minister of Foreign Trade and president of the National Council for Trade Facilitation (CONAFAC).

She contributed to the project to create an Innovation Agency and a Public Innovation Laboratory.

Following the resignation of Alvarado Briceño as Minister of Science, Innovation, Technology and Telecommunications of Costa Rica on 1 February 2023, Bogantes was designated his successor. She was sworn in on 6 February 2023. She stated that issues such as implementing cybersecurity strategies, artificial intelligence, and blockchain would be the key priorities of her administration.

Afteter the cyberattack against the Costa Rican Institute of Electricity in March 2026, Bogantes suggested that the attack may have originated in China.

== Personal life ==
She is married and speaks Spanish and English.
