= 2020 cyberattacks on Sri Lanka =

Attack on Sri Lankan national websites

- Date: 17 May 2020
- Location: Sri Lanka

The 2020 cyberattacks on Sri Lanka were a series of cyberattacks on at least 5 Sri Lankan national websites with the top-level domains of .gov and .com. The cyberattack is speculated to have been conducted on 17 and 18 May 2020. The cyber-attack was also launched on the leading news website of Sri Lanka. The website of the Chinese Embassy operating in Sri Lanka and the website of Cabinet Office in Sri Lanka were also affected by the cyberattack. The investigations are currently carried out by Sri Lanka Computer Emergency Readiness Team along with the Information Technology Society of Sri Lanka (ITSSL). ITSSL believes that this cyber attack conducted by a group called 'Tamil Eelam Cyber Force'.
