= Todayhumor =

South Korean internet forum

- Website type: Internet forum
- Owner: Lee Hocheol
- Creator: Lee Hocheol
- Website: todayhumor.co.kr
- Commercial: Yes (partly)
- Registration: Optional
- Launched: September 1999
- Current status: Active

Todayhumor (Korean: 오늘의유머) frequently noted under the initialism 오유 (OU), is a South Korean internet forum. Initially established as a community dedicated to humor, it became a left-leaning political website due to its unique nature.

== Overview ==
Todayhumor launched in September 1999 as a subsection of Infomail.co.kr, a South Korean email service. As of April 2013, it is owned and operated as a private organization.

== Presidential election, 2012 ==
During the 2012 South Korean presidential election, an agent of South Korean National Intelligence Service, known by her last name Kim, created multiple user IDs in Todayhumor website and posted articles and comments. South Korean Police confirmed that she had signed up for 16 user IDs and made 288 clicks to express support or opposition to articles in Todayhumor. They also confirmed that she posted articles to Todayhumor on politically sensitive topics including Jeju-do Naval Base and Four Major Rivers Project. Subsequently, the police announced that 5 user IDs out of 16 were used by others.
