= 2021 cyberattacks on Sri Lanka =

Attacks on Sri Lankan national websites

2021 Cyberattacks on Sri Lanka
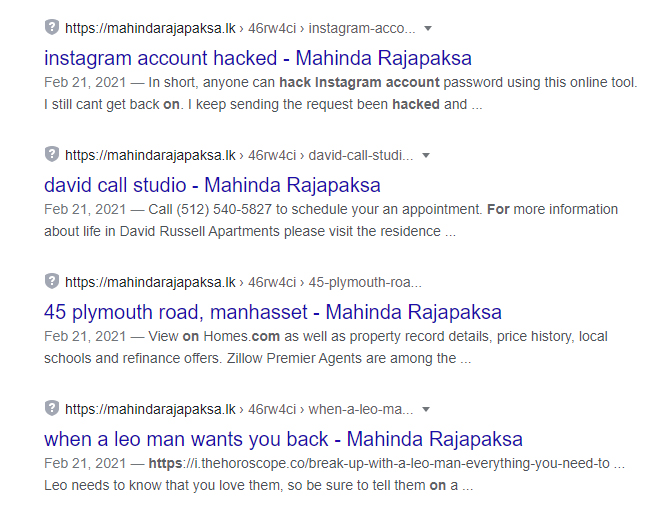
- Prime Minister Mahinda Rajapaksa's official website hacked
- Date: 6 February 2021, 18 May 2021
- Location: Sri Lanka

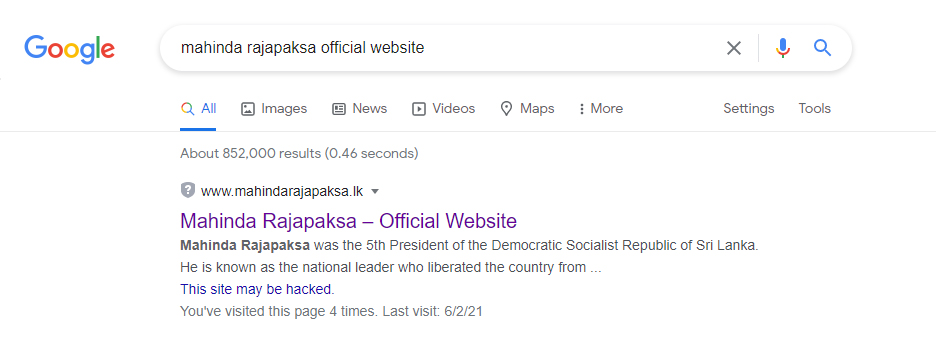
Sri Lankan Prime Minister Mahinda Rajapaksa's official website hacked

The 2021 cyberattacks on Sri Lanka were a series of cyberattacks on at least 10 Sri Lankan national websites including Google.lk domain.

== First Cyber-Attack ==
The first cyber-attack was launched on The LK Domain Registry website on 6 February 2021. The investigations are currently carried out by Sri Lanka Computer Emergency Readiness Team along with the Information Technology Society of Sri Lanka (ITSSL). Telecommunications Regulatory Commission of Sri Lanka were also tweeted regarding the Cyberattack as public alert.

== Second Cyber-Attack ==
The second cyber-attack was carried out on 18 May 2021. The website of the Chinese Embassy operating in Sri Lanka, The websites of the Health Ministry, Energy Ministry and the Rajarata University websites were affected by this cyberattack. This cyber attack conducted by a group called 'Tamil Eelam Cyber Force'.

== Cyber attack on Prime Minister Mahinda's website ==
The official website of Sri Lankan prime minister Mahinda Rajapaksa was hacked on June 3, 2021.

The Information Technology Society Sri Lanka - ITSSL said the PM’s website was hacked in a manner in which any visitor to the website would be redirected to another website which displays content related to the Bitcoin cryptocurrency.
