= 2025 Paraguay ransomware attack =

Cyberattack in Paraguay in June 2025

- Date: 11 June 2025
- Location: Paraguay
- Type: Cyberattack
- Theme: Ransomware encrypting files with US$ 7.4 million demand
- Outcome: Data leaked online, with the government denying it was hacked

On 11 June 2025, an international hacker group called Brigada Cyber PC supposedly hacked several Paraguayan Government agencies, asking for a ransom of roughly 1 dollar per citizen.

The Government denied paying the ransom and the data was leaked online on 13 June. According to the government the attack was not real, with the data being gathered from previous ransomware attacks.

== Attack ==
On 11 June 2025, a hacker group called Brigada Cyber PC posted on a darknet forum darkforums.st that they stole data from every Paraguayan and threatened to post it online unless the Government paid US$7.4 Million, about one dollar per citizen, up until a timer reached zero, on 13 June.

The Government was hacked by two other international hacker groups, Leaker and CyberTeam, on a spawn of only three months.

== Reactions ==
The Government was warned about the attack by the American company Resecurity.

On the same day, the Government denied that the group has hacked the Government, affirming that the data was collected on previous ransomware attacks.

The Minister of Technology and Information Gustavo Villate declared to Organized Crime and Corruption Reporting Project (OCCRP) that "the Government never negotiates with this types of actors". The Ministry also began investigating new security breaches of the governmental systems.

== Leakage ==
Hours after the timer reached zero, the data was leaked online. It included data harverested from at least 18 Governmental agencies, including the National Traffic Agency, the Cordillera Department, the Presidency of the Republic, and the Ministries of Public Health, Justice, Education and Agriculture. The data was published on three different files.

Gustavo Villate declared that indeed the data published was collected on previous leakages, as it didn't coincide with the official governmental databases, and there was data from more people than the population of the country. Data from 7.4 million people was leaked, while the Paraguayan population on the last census was of 6 million people.
