= Advanced Intelligent Systems =

Scientific journal

- Discipline: Engineering
- Language: English
- Edited by: Babak Mostaghaci

Publication details
- History: 2019–present
- Publisher: Wiley-VCH
- Frequency: Monthly
- Open access: Yes
- License: CC BY
- Impact factor: 7.4 (2022)

Standard abbreviations
- ISO 4: Adv. Intell. Syst.

Indexing
- ISSN: 2640-4567
- OCLC no.: 1066240706

Links
- Journal homepage; Online access; Online archive

Advanced Intelligent Systems is a monthly peer-reviewed open access scientific journal covering research on artificial systems that recognize, process, and respond to stimuli/instructions and learn from experience, including robotics, automation, artificial intelligence and machine learning, the human-machine interface, control theory and systems, smart and responsive materials, smart sensing systems, and programmed self-assembly.

== Abstracting and indexing ==
The journal is abstracted and indexed in:

- Ei Compendex
- Current Contents/ Engineering, Computing & Technology
- Inspec
- Science Citation Index Expanded

According to the Journal Citation Reports, the journal has a 2022 impact factor of 7.4.
