= Ministry of Science, Innovation, Technology and Telecommunications =

Costa Rican government department

- Ministerio de Ciencia, Innovación, Tecnología y Telecomunicaciones
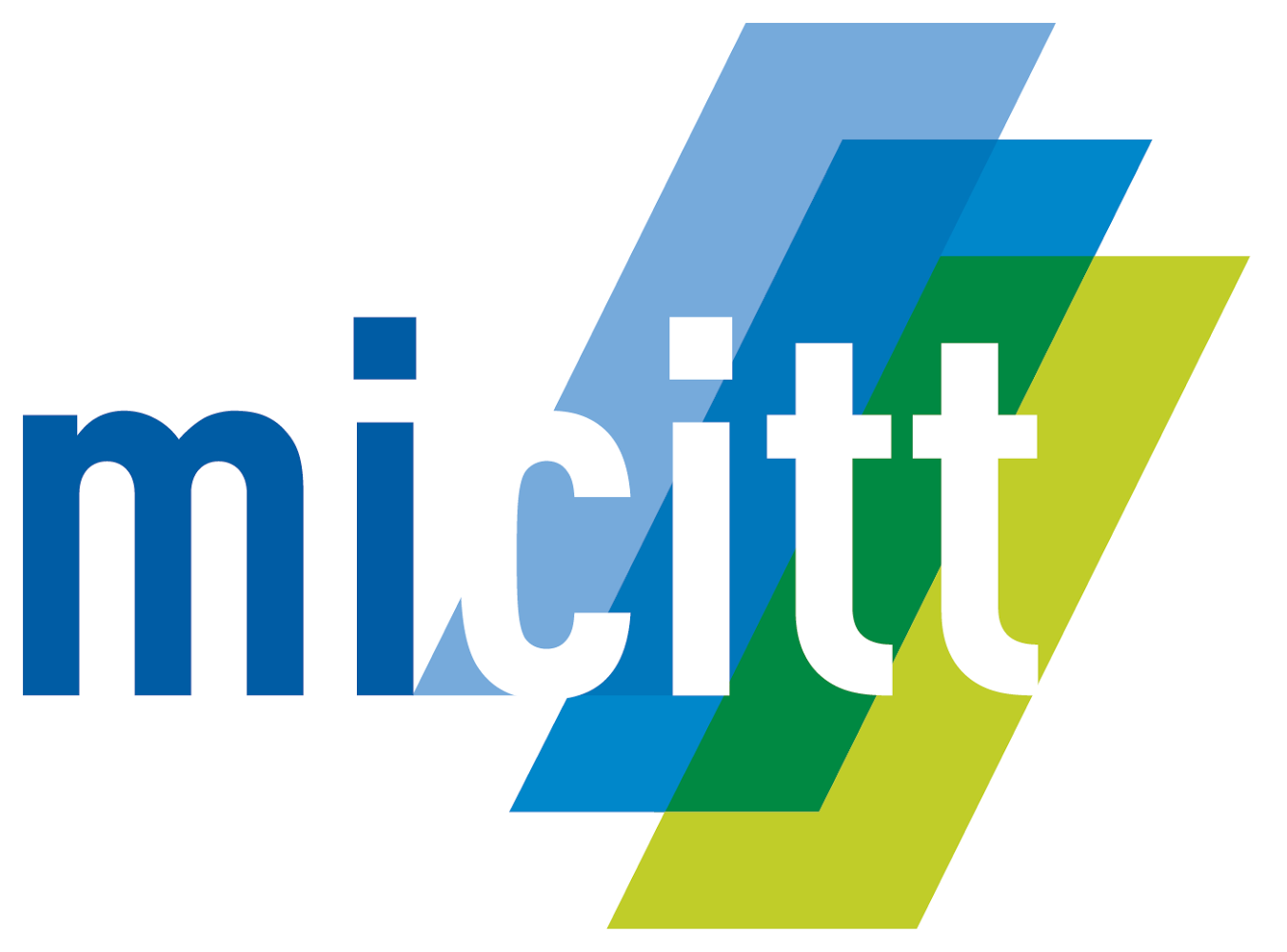

Ministry overview
- Formed: June 26, 1990
- Type: Ministry
- Headquarters: Avenida 20, Ruta 204, 10105 Zapote, San José
- Annual budget: ¢ 8,378,355,000 (2020)
- Minister responsible: Paula Bogantes Zamora, Minister
- Vice Minister responsible: Federico Torres Carballo, Vice Minister of Science and Technology; Teodoro Willink Castro, Vice Minister of Telecommunications
- Parent department: Government of Costa Rica
- Website: https://www.micit.go.cr/

The Ministry of Science, Innovation, Technology and Telecommunications (Spanish: Ministerio de Ciencia, Innovación, Tecnología y Telecomunicaciones, MICITT) is part of the government of Costa Rica, it was created on 26 June 1990.

The current Minister is Paula Bogantes Zamora. The Vice Minister of Science and Technology is Federico Torres Carballo. The Vice Minister of Telecommunications is Teodoro Willink Castro.

== Structure ==
The Ministry is structure in the following way:

- Office of the Minister (Despacho de la Ministra)
  - Financial Administrative Directorate (Dirección Administrativa Financiera)
  - Digital Governance Directorate (Dirección de Gobernanza Digital)
  - Internal Audit (Auditoría Interna)
  - Comptroller of Services (Contraloría de Servicios)
  - Secretariat of Institutional and Sectoral Planning (Secretaría de Planificación Institucional y Sectorial)
  - Legal Affairs Unit (Spanish:Unidad de Asuntos Jurídicos)
  - Institutional Communication Unit (Unidad de Comunicación Institucional)
  - International Cooperation Unit (Unidad de Cooperación Internacional)
  - Technological Services Unit (Unidad de Servicios Tecnológicos)
- Vice Ministry of Science and Technology (Viceministerio de Ciencia y Tecnología)
  - Directorate of Social Appropriation of Knowledge (Dirección de Apropiación Social del Conocimiento)
  - Innovation Department (Dirección de Innovación)
  - Department of Research and Technological Development (Dirección de Investigación y Desarrollo Tecnológico)
  - Innovation and Human Capital Program for Competitiveness PINN (Programa de Innovación y Capital Humano para la Competitividad PINN)
  - Technical Secretary for Incentives (Secretaría Técnica de Incentivos)
- Vice Ministry of Telecommunications (Viceministerio de Telecomunicaciones)
  - Radio Spectrum and Telecommunications Networks Directorate (Dirección Espectro Radioeléctrico y Redes de Telecomunicaciones)
  - Directorate of Evolution and Telecommunications Market (Dirección de Evolución y Mercado de Telecomunicaciones)
  - Department of Concessions and Standards. (Dirección de Concesiones y Normas)
