= List of security hacking incidents =

This list of security hacking incidents covers important or noteworthy events in the history of security hacking and cracking.

== 1900s ==
=== 1903 ===
- Magician and inventor Nevil Maskelyne disrupted John Ambrose Fleming's public demonstration of Guglielmo Marconi's supposedly secure wireless telegraphy technology by transmitting insulting Morse code messages through the auditorium's projector.

== 1930s ==
=== 1932 ===
- Polish cryptologists Marian Rejewski, Henryk Zygalski, and Jerzy Różycki broke the code used by the Enigma machine.

=== 1939 ===
- Alan Turing, Gordon Welchman, and Harold Keen worked together to develop Bombe, a code breaking device based on Rejewski's work on Bomba. The Enigma machine's use of a reliably small key space makes it vulnerable to brute force attacks.

== 1940s ==
=== 1943 ===
- René Carmille, comptroller general of the Vichy French Army, interfered the punch card system used by the Nazis to locate Jews.

=== 1949 ===
- The theory that underlines computer viruses was first made public in 1949, when computer pioneer John von Neumann presented a paper titled "Theory and Organization of Complicated Automata". In the paper, von Neumann speculated that computer programs could reproduce themselves.

== 1950s ==
=== 1955 ===
- At MIT, the term "hack" was used to refer to experimenting with machines. A meeting of the Tech Model Railroad Club held in April 1955 notes a participant saying, "Mr. Eccles requests that anyone working or hacking on the electrical system turn the power off to avoid fuse blowing."

=== 1957 ===
- Joe "Joybubbles" Engressia, a blind seven-year-old boy with absolute pitch, discovered that whistling the fourth E above middle C (a frequency of Hz) would interfere with AT&T's automated telephone systems, thereby inadvertently opening the door for phreaking, the hacking of analogue telephone systems.

== 1960s ==
- Various phreaking boxes were used to interact with automated telephone systems.

=== 1963 ===
- The first known reference to malicious hacking appeared in MIT's student newspaper, The Tech, in an article about phreaking. The article reported that hackers had tied up Harvard phone lines by configuring the Digital Equipment computer PDP-1 to make free calls. This was to conduct security attacks called "war dialing" via dial up modems. All these activities created large phone bills for the university.

=== 1965 ===
- William D. Mathews of MIT found a vulnerability in the Compatible Time-Sharing System (CTSS) operating system running on an IBM 7094. The system's standard text editor was designed to be used by one user, working in one directory, at a time. As a result, it created a temporary file with a constant name for all instances of the editor. This flaw was discovered when two system programmers were editing at the same time and the temporary files for the 'message of the day' file and the password file were found to be swapped, causing the contents of the operating system password file to display to any user logging into the system.

=== 1967 ===
- The first known incidence of a kind of hacking called network penetration took place when members of a computer club at a suburban Chicago high school were provided access to IBM's APL network. In the fall of 1967, IBM, through Science Research Associates, approached Evanston Township High School with the offer of four 2741 Selectric teletypewriter based terminals with dial-up modem connectivity to an experimental computer system which implemented an early version of the APL programming language. The APL network system was structured into workspaces which were assigned to various clients using the system. Working independently, the students quickly learned the language and the system. They were free to explore the system, often using existing code available in public workspaces as models for their own creations. Eventually, curiosity drove the students to explore the system's wider context. This first informal network penetration effort was later acknowledged as helping harden the security of one of the first publicly accessible networks:
  Science Research Associates undertook to write a full APL system for the IBM 1500. They modeled their system after APL/360, which had by that time been developed and seen substantial use inside of IBM, using code borrowed from MAT/1500 where possible. In their documentation, they acknowledge their gratitude to "a number of high school students for their compulsion to bomb the system". This was an early example of a kind of sportive, but very effective, debugging that was often repeated in the evolution of APL systems.

== 1970s ==
=== 1971 ===
- John T. Draper (later nicknamed Captain Crunch), his friend Joe Engressia (also known as Joybubbles), and blue box phone phreaking hit the news with an Esquire magazine feature story.

=== 1979 ===
- Kevin Mitnick breaks into his first major computer system, the Ark, which was the computer system Digital Equipment Corporation (DEC) used for developing their RSTS/E operating system.

== 1980s ==
=== 1980 ===
- The FBI investigated a breach of security at National CSS (NCSS). The New York Times, reporting on the incident in 1981, describes hackers as:

Technical experts, skilled, often young, computer programmers who almost whimsically probe the defenses of a computer system, searching out the limits and the possibilities of the machine. Despite their seemingly subversive role, hackers are a recognized asset in the computer industry, often highly prized.

The newspaper describes white hat activities as part of a "mischievous but perversely positive 'hacker' tradition". When a National CSS employee revealed the existence of his password cracker, which he had used on customer accounts, the company chastised him not for writing the software but for not disclosing it sooner. The letter of reprimand stated that "The Company realizes the benefit to NCSS and in fact encourages the efforts of employees to identify security weaknesses to the VP, the directory, and other sensitive software in files".

=== 1981 ===
- Chaos Computer Club forms in Germany.
- Ian Murphy (also known as Captain Zap), was the first cracker to be tried and convicted as a felon. Murphy broke into AT&T's computers and changed the internal clocks that metered billing rates. People were getting late-night discount rates when they called at midday. Of course, the bargain-seekers who waited until midnight to call long distance were hit with high bills.

=== 1983 ===
- The 414s hack into 60 computer systems at institutions ranging from the Los Alamos National Laboratory to Manhattan's Memorial Sloan-Kettering Cancer Center. The incident appeared as the cover story of Newsweek with the title "Beware: Hackers at play". As a result, the U.S. House of Representatives held hearings on computer security and passed several laws.
- The group KILOBAUD was formed in February, kicking off a series of other hacker groups that formed soon after.
- The movie WarGames introduces the wider public to the phenomenon of hacking and creates a degree of mass paranoia about hackers and their supposed abilities to bring the world to a screeching halt by launching nuclear ICBMs.
- The U.S. House of Representatives begins hearings on computer security hacking.
- In his Turing Award lecture, Ken Thompson mentions "hacking" and describes a security exploit that he calls a "Trojan horse".

=== 1984 ===
- Someone calling himself Lex Luthor founds the Legion of Doom. Named after a Saturday morning cartoon, the LOD had the reputation of attracting "the best of the best"—until one of the most talented members, Phiber Optik, feuded with Legion of Doomer Erik Bloodaxe and got 'tossed out of the clubhouse'. Phiber's friends formed a rival group, the Masters of Deception.
- The Comprehensive Crime Control Act gives the Secret Service jurisdiction over computer fraud.
- The Cult of the Dead Cow forms in Lubbock, Texas, and begins publishing its underground ezine.
- The hacker magazine 2600 begins regular publication, right when TAP was putting out its final issue. The editor of 2600, "Emmanuel Goldstein" (whose real name is Eric Corley), takes his handle from the leader of the resistance in George Orwell's Nineteen Eighty-Four. The publication provides tips for would-be hackers and phone phreaks, as well as commentary on the hacker issues of the day. Today, copies of 2600 are sold at most large retail bookstores.
- The Chaos Communication Congress, the annual European hacker conference organized by the Chaos Computer Club, is held in Hamburg, Germany.
- William Gibson's groundbreaking science fiction novel Neuromancer, about "Case", a futuristic computer hacker, was published. Considered the first major cyberpunk novel, it brought into hacker jargon such terms as "cyberspace", "the matrix", "simstim", and "ICE".

=== 1985 ===
- KILOBAUD is re-organized into P.H.I.R.M. and begins sysopping hundreds of bulletin board systems (BBSs) throughout the United States, Canada, and Europe.
- The online 'zine Phrack is established.
- The Hacker's Handbook is published in the UK.
- The FBI, Secret Service, Middlesex County NJ Prosecutor's Office and various local law enforcement agencies execute seven search warrants concurrently across New Jersey on July 12, 1985, seizing equipment from BBS operators and users alike for "complicity in computer theft", under a newly passed, and yet untested criminal statute. This is famously known as the Private Sector Bust, or the 2600 BBS Seizure, and implicated the Private Sector BBS sysop, Store Manager (also a BBS sysop), Beowulf, Red Barchetta, The Vampire, the NJ Hack Shack BBS sysop, and the Treasure Chest BBS sysop.

=== 1986 ===
- After more and more break-ins to government and corporate computers, Congress passes the Computer Fraud and Abuse Act, which makes it a crime to break into computer systems. The law, however, does not cover juveniles.
- Robert Schifreen and Stephen Gold are convicted of accessing the Telecom Gold account belonging to the Duke of Edinburgh under the Forgery and Counterfeiting Act 1981 in the United Kingdom, the first conviction for illegally accessing a computer system. On appeal, the conviction is overturned as hacking is not within the legal definition of forgery.
- Arrest of a hacker who calls himself The Mentor. He published a now-famous treatise shortly after his arrest that came to be known as the Hacker Manifesto in the e-zine Phrack. This still serves as the most famous piece of hacker literature and is frequently used to illustrate the mindset of hackers.
- Astronomer Clifford Stoll plays a pivotal role in tracking down hacker Markus Hess, events later covered in Stoll's 1990 book The Cuckoo's Egg.

=== 1987 ===
- The Christmas Tree EXEC "worm" causes major disruption to the VNET, BITNET and EARN networks.

=== 1988 ===
- The Morris Worm. Graduate student Robert T. Morris Jr. of Cornell University launches a worm on the government's ARPAnet (precursor to the Internet). The worm spreads to 6,000 networked computers, clogging government and university systems. Robert Morris is dismissed from Cornell, sentenced to three years' probation, and fined $10,000.
- First National Bank of Chicago is the victim of a $70 million computer theft.
- The Computer Emergency Response Team (CERT) is created by DARPA to address network security.
- The Father Christmas (computer worm) spreads over DECnet networks.

=== 1989 ===
- Jude Milhon (aka St Jude) and R. U. Sirius launch MONDO 2000, a major '90s tech-lifestyle magazine, in Berkeley, California.
- The politically motivated WANK worm spreads over DECnet.
- Dutch magazine Hack-Tic begins.
- The Cuckoo's Egg by Clifford Stoll is published.
- The detection of AIDS (Trojan horse) is the first instance of a ransomware detection.

== 1990s ==
=== 1990 ===
- Operation Sundevil introduced. After a prolonged sting investigation, Secret Service agents swoop down on organizers and prominent members of BBSs in 14 U.S. cities including the Legion of Doom, conducting early-morning raids and arrests. The arrests involve and are aimed at cracking down on credit-card theft and telephone and wire fraud. The result is a breakdown in the hacking community, with members informing on each other in exchange for immunity. The offices of Steve Jackson Games are also raided, and the role-playing sourcebook GURPS Cyberpunk is confiscated, possibly because the government fears it is a "handbook for computer crime". Legal battles arise that prompt the formation of the Electronic Frontier Foundation, including the trial of Knight Lightning.
- Australian federal police tracking Realm members Phoenix, Electron and Nom are the first in the world to use a remote data intercept to gain evidence for a computer crime prosecution.
- The Computer Misuse Act 1990 is passed in the United Kingdom, criminalising any unauthorised access to computer systems.

=== 1992 ===
- Release of the movie Sneakers, in which security experts are blackmailed into stealing a universal decoder for encryption systems.
- One of the first ISPs, MindVox, opens to the public.
- Bulgarian virus writer Dark Avenger wrote 1260, the first known use of polymorphic code, used to circumvent the type of pattern recognition used by antivirus software, and nowadays also intrusion detection systems.
- Publication of a hacking instruction manual for penetrating TRW credit reporting agency by Infinite Possibilities Society (IPS) gets Dr. Ripco, the sysop of Ripco BBS mentioned in the IPS manual, arrested by the United States Secret Service.

=== 1993 ===
- The first DEF CON hacking conference takes place in Las Vegas. The conference is meant to be a one-time party to say good-bye to BBSs (now replaced by the Web), but the gathering was so popular it became an annual event.
- AOL gives its users access to Usenet, precipitating Eternal September.

=== 1994 ===
- Summer: Russian crackers siphon $10 million from Citibank and transfer the money to bank accounts around the world. Vladimir Levin, the 30-year-old ringleader, used his work laptop after hours to transfer the funds to accounts in Finland and Israel. Levin stands trial in the United States and is sentenced to three years in prison. Authorities recover all but $400,000 of the stolen money.
- Hackers adapt to emergence of the World Wide Web quickly, moving all their how-to information and hacking programs from the old BBSs to new hacker web sites.
- AOHell is released, a freeware application that allows a burgeoning community of unskilled script kiddies to wreak havoc on America Online. For days, hundreds of thousands of AOL users find their mailboxes flooded with multi-megabyte email bombs and their chat rooms disrupted with spam messages.
- December 27: After experiencing an IP spoofing attack by Kevin Mitnick, computer security expert Tsutomu Shimomura started to receive prank calls that popularized the phrase "My kung fu is stronger than yours".

=== 1995 ===
- The movies The Net and Hackers are released.
- The Canadian ISP dlcwest.com is hacked and the website is replaced with a graphic and the caption "You've been hacked MOFO"
- The US Secret Service raids 12 and arrests 6 cellular phone hackers in Operation Cybersnare
- February 22: The FBI raids the "Phone Masters".

=== 1996 ===
- Hackers alter websites of the United States Department of Justice (August), the CIA (October), and the U.S. Air Force (December).
- Canadian hacker group, Brotherhood, breaks into the Canadian Broadcasting Corporation.
- Arizona hacker, John Sabo A.K.A FizzleB/Peanut, was arrested for hacking Canadian ISP dlcwest.com claiming the company was defrauding customers through over billing.
- The US General Accounting Office reports that hackers attempted to break into Defense Department computer files some 250,000 times in 1995 alone, with a success rate of about 65% and doubling annually.
- Cryptovirology is born with the invention of the cryptoviral extortion protocol that would later form the basis of modern ransomware.

=== 1997 ===
- The AOL hack program Lucifer-X by NailZ, is released. In a matter of days AOL is being used for free by hundreds of thousands of users.
- A 16-year-old Croatian youth penetrates computers at a U.S. Air Force base in Guam.
- June: Eligible Receiver 97 tests the American government's readiness against cyberattacks.
- December: Information Security publishes first issue.
- First high-profile attacks on Microsoft's Windows NT operating system

=== 1998 ===
- January: Yahoo! notifies Internet users that anyone visiting its site in the past month might have downloaded a logic bomb and worm planted by hackers claiming a "logic bomb" will go off if computer hacker Kevin Mitnick is not released from prison.
- February: The Internet Software Consortium proposes the use of DNSSEC (Domain Name System Security Extensions) to secure DNS servers.
- May 19: The seven members of the hacker think tank known as L0pht testify in front of the US congressional Government Affairs committee on "Weak Computer Security in Government".
- June: Information Security publishes its first annual Industry Survey, finding that nearly three-quarters of organizations suffered a security incident in the previous year.
- September: Electronic Disturbance Theater, an online political performance-art group, attacks the websites of The Pentagon, Mexican president Ernesto Zedillo, and the Frankfurt Stock Exchange, calling it conceptual art and claiming it to be a protest against the suppression of the Zapatista Army of National Liberation in southern Mexico. EDT uses the FloodNet software to bombard its opponents with access requests.
- October: "U.S. Attorney General Janet Reno announces National Infrastructure Protection Center."

=== 1999 ===
- Software security goes mainstream. In the wake of Microsoft's Windows 98 release, 1999 becomes a banner year for security (and hacking). Hundreds of advisories and patches are released in response to newfound (and widely publicized) bugs in Windows and other commercial software products. A host of security software vendors release anti-hacking products for use on home computers.
- U.S. President Bill Clinton announces a $1.46 billion initiative to improve government computer security. The plan would establish a network of intrusion detection monitors for certain federal agencies and encourage the private sector to do the same.
- January 7: The "Legion of the Underground" (LoU) declares "war" against the governments of Iraq and the People's Republic of China. An international coalition of hackers (including Cult of the Dead Cow, 2600's staff, Phrack's staff, L0pht, and the Chaos Computer Club) issued a joint statement (CRD 990107 - Hackers on planet earth against infowar) condemning the LoU's declaration of war. The LoU responded by withdrawing its declaration.
- March: The Melissa worm is released and quickly becomes the most costly malware outbreak to date.
- July: Cult of the Dead Cow releases Back Orifice 2000 at DEF CON.
- August: Kevin Mitnick, is sentenced to 5 years, of which over 4 years had already been spent pre-trial including 8 months' solitary confinement.
- September: Level Seven Crew hacks the U.S. Embassy in China's website and places racist, anti-government slogans on the embassy site in regards to 1998 U.S. embassy bombings.
- September 16: The United States Department of Justice sentences the "Phone Masters".
- October: American Express introduces the "Blue" smart card, the industry's first chip-based credit card in the US.
- November 17: A hacker interviewed by Hilly Rose during the radio show Coast to Coast AM (then hosted by Art Bell) exposes a plot by al-Qaeda to derail Amtrak trains. This results in all trains being forcibly stopped over Y2K as a safety measure.

== 2000s ==
=== 2000 ===
- May: The ILOVEYOU worm, also known as VBS/Loveletter and Love Bug worm, is a computer worm written in VBScript. It infected millions of computers worldwide within a few hours of its release on May 4. It is considered to be one of the most damaging worms ever. It originated in the Philippines and was made by AMA Computer College student Onel de Guzman for his thesis.
- September: Computer hacker Jonathan James became the first juvenile to serve jail time for hacking.

=== 2001 ===
- Microsoft becomes a prominent victim of a new type of hack that targets the domain name server. During these denial-of-service attacks, DNS paths that take users to Microsoft's websites are corrupted.
- February: A Dutch hacker releases the Anna Kournikova virus, initiating a wave of viruses that tempts users to open infected attachment by promising a promiscuous picture of the Russian tennis star, Anna Kournikova.
- April: FBI agents trick two Russian Hackers into traveling to the U.S., where they revealed how they were hacking U.S. banks.
- July: Russian programmer Dmitry Sklyarov is arrested at the annual DEF CON hacker convention. He becomes the first person to be criminally charged with violating the Digital Millennium Copyright Act (DMCA).
- August: Code Red worm infects tens of thousands of machines.
- The National Cyber Security Alliance (NCSA) is established in response to the September 11 attacks on the World Trade Center.

=== 2002 ===
- January: Bill Gates announces that Microsoft will prioritize the security of its products and services, and launches a large-scale internal training and quality control campaign.
- March: Gary McKinnon is arrested following unauthorized access to U.S. military and NASA computers.
- May: Klez.H, a variant of the worm discovered in November 2001, becomes the largest malware outbreak in terms of machines infected, but causes little monetary damage.
- June: The Bush administration files a bill to create the Department of Homeland Security, which among other things, will be responsible for protecting the nation's critical IT infrastructure.
- August: Researcher Chris Paget publishes a paper describing "shatter attacks", detailing how Windows' unauthenticated messaging system can be used to take over a machine. The paper raises questions about Windows security. It is however, largely dismissed because it is considered irrelevant, as the vulnerabilities it described are caused by vulnerable applications (placing windows on the desktop with inappropriate privileges) rather than an inherent flaw within the Operating System.
- October: The International Information Systems Security Certification Consortium—(ISC)²—confers its 10,000th CISSP certification.

=== 2003 ===
- The hacktivist group Anonymous is formed.
- March: Cult of the Dead Cow and Hacktivismo are given permission by the United States Department of Commerce to export software that uses strong encryption.

=== 2004 ===
- March: New Zealand's government website (National Party) is defaced by hacktivist group BlackMask
- July: North Korea claims to have trained 500 hackers who successfully crack South Korean, Japanese, and their allies' computer systems.
- October: National Cyber Security Awareness Month was launched by the National Cyber Security Alliance and U.S. Department of Homeland Security.

=== 2005 ===
- April 2: Rafael Núñez (aka RaFa), a notorious member of the hacking group World of Hell, is arrested following his arrival at Miami International Airport for breaking into the Defense Information Systems Agency computer system in June 2001.
- September 13: Cameron Lacroix is sentenced to 11 months for gaining access to T-Mobile's network and exploiting Paris Hilton's Sidekick.
- November 3: Jeanson James Ancheta, whom prosecutors say was a member of the "Botmaster Underground", a group of script kiddies mostly noted for their excessive use of bot attacks and propagating vast amounts of spam, was taken into custody after being lured to FBI offices in Los Angeles.

=== 2006 ===
- January: One of the few worms to take after the old form of malware, destruction of data rather than the accumulation of zombie networks to launch attacks from, is discovered. It had various names, including Kama Sutra (used by most media reports), Black Worm, Mywife, Blackmal, Nyxem version D, Kapser, KillAV, Grew and CME-24. The worm would spread through e-mail client address books, and would search for documents and fill them with garbage, instead of deleting them to confuse the user. It would also hit a web page counter when it took control, allowing the programmer who created it as well as the world to track the progress of the worm. It would replace documents with random garbage on the third of every month. It was hyped by the media but actually affected relatively few computers, and was not a real threat for most users.
- May: Jeanson James Ancheta receives a 57-month prison sentence, and is ordered to pay damages amounting to $15,000 to the Naval Air Warfare Center in China Lake and the Defense Information Systems Agency, for damage done due to DDoS attacks and hacking. Ancheta also had to forfeit his gains to the government, which include $60,000 in cash, a BMW, and computer equipment.
- May: The largest defacement in Web History as of that time is performed by the Turkish hacker iSKORPiTX who successfully hacked 21,549 websites in one shot.
- July: Robert Moore and Edwin Pena were the first people to be charged by U.S. authorities for VoIP hacking. Robert Moore served 2 years in federal prison and was given $152,000 restitution. Once Edwin Pena was caught after fleeing the country, evading authorities for almost 2 years, he was sentenced to 10 years and given $1 million restitution.
- September: Viodentia releases FairUse4WM tool which would remove DRM information off Windows Media Audio (WMA) files downloaded from music services such as Yahoo! Unlimited, Napster, Rhapsody Music and Urge.

=== 2007 ===
- May 17: Estonia recovers from a massive denial-of-service attack
- June 13: FBI Operation Bot Roast finds over 1 million botnet victims
- June 21: A spear phishing incident at the Office of the Secretary of Defense steals sensitive U.S. defense information, leading to significant changes in identity and message-source verification at OSD.
- August 11: United Nations website hacked by Indian Hacker Pankaj Kumar Singh.
- November 14: Panda Burning Incense which is known by several other names, including Fujacks and Radoppan.T led to the arrest of eight people in China. Panda Burning Incense was a parasitic virus that infected executable files on a PC. When infected, the icon of the executable file changes to an image of a panda holding three sticks of incense. The arrests were the first for virus writing in China.

=== 2008 ===
- January 17: Project Chanology; Anonymous attacks Scientology website servers around the world. Private documents are stolen from Scientology computers and distributed over the Internet.
- March 7: Around 20 Chinese hackers claim to have gained access to the world's most sensitive sites, including the Pentagon. They operated from an apartment on a Chinese island.
- March 14: Trend Micro website successfully hacked by Turkish hacker Janizary (aka Utku).

=== 2009 ===
- April 4: Conficker worm infiltrated millions of PCs worldwide including many government-level top-security computer networks.

== 2010s ==
=== 2010 ===
- January 12: Operation Aurora Google publicly reveals that it has been on the receiving end of a "highly sophisticated and targeted attack on our corporate infrastructure originating from China that resulted in the theft of intellectual property from Google"
- June: The Stuxnet worm is found by VirusBlokAda. Stuxnet was unusual in that while it spread via Windows computers, its payload targeted just one specific model and type of SCADA systems. It slowly became clear that it was a cyber attack on Iran's nuclear facilities—with most experts believing that Israel was behind it—perhaps with US help.
- December 3: The first malware conference, MALCON took place in India. Founded by Rajshekhar Murthy, malware coders were invited to showcase their skills at this annual event supported by the Indian government.

=== 2011 ===
- The hacker group Lulz Security is formed.
- April 9: The Bank of America website was hacked by a Turkish hacker named JeOPaRDY. An estimated 85,000 credit card numbers and accounts were reported to have been stolen due to the hack. Bank officials say no personal customer bank information is available on that web-page. Investigations are being conducted by the FBI to trace down the incriminated hacker.
- April 17: An "external intrusion" sends the PlayStation Network offline, and compromises personally identifying information (possibly including credit card details) of its 77 million accounts, in what is claimed to be one of the five largest data breaches ever.
- Computer hacker sl1nk releases information of his penetration in the servers of the Department of Defense (DoD), Pentagon, NASA, NSA, US Military, Department of the Navy, Space and Naval Warfare System Command and other UK/US government websites.
- September: Bangladeshi hacker TiGER-M@TE made a world record in defacement history by hacking 700,000 websites in a single shot.
- October 16: The YouTube channel of Sesame Street was hacked, streaming pornography for about 22 minutes.
- November 1: The main phone and Internet networks of the Palestinian territories sustained a hacker attack from multiple locations worldwide.
- November 7: The forums for Valve's Steam service were hacked. Redirects for a hacking website, Fkn0wned, appeared on the Steam users' forums, offering "hacking tutorials and tools, porn, free giveaways and much more."
- December 14: Five members of the Norwegian hacker group, Noria, were arrested, allegedly suspected for hacking into the email account of the militant extremist Anders Behring Breivik (who perpetrated the 2011 attacks in the country).

=== 2012 ===
- A hacker published over 400,000 credit cards online, and threatened Israel to release 1 million credit cards in the future. In response to that incident, an Israeli hacker published over 200 Albanian credit cards online.
- Gottfrid Svartholm Warg, the co-founder of Pirate Bay, was convicted in Denmark of hacking a mainframe computer, in what was then Denmark's biggest hacking case.
- January 7: "Team Appunity", a group of Norwegian hackers, were arrested for breaking into Norway's largest prostitution website then publishing the user database online.
- February 3: Marriott was hacked by a New Age ideologist, Attila Nemeth who was resisting against the New World Order where he said that corporations are allegedly controlling the world. As a response Marriott reported him to the United States Secret Service.
- February 8: Foxconn is hacked by a hacker group, "Swagg Security", releasing a massive amount of data including email and server logins, and even more alarming—bank account credentials of large companies like Apple and Microsoft. Swagg Security stages the attack just as a Foxconn protest ignites against terrible working conditions in southern China.
- May 4: The websites of several Turkish representative offices of international IT-companies are defaced within the same day by Turkish hacker F0RTYS3V3N, including the websites of Google, Yandex, Microsoft, Gmail, MSN, Hotmail, PayPal.
- May 24: WHMCS is hacked by UGNazi, they claim that the reason for this is because of the illegal sites that are using their software.
- May 31: MyBB is hacked by newly founded hacker group, UGNazi. The website was defaced for about a day, they claim their reasoning for this was because they were upset that the forum board Hackforums.net uses their software.
- June 5: The social networking website LinkedIn was hacked and the passwords for nearly 6.5 million user accounts were stolen. As a result, a United States grand jury indicted Nikulin and three unnamed co-conspirators on charges of aggravated identity theft and computer intrusion.
- August 15: Saudi Aramco was crippled by a cyber warfare attack for months by malware called Shamoon. It was considered the biggest hack in history in terms of cost and destructiveness and carried out by the Iranian attacker group Cutting Sword of Justice. Iranian hackers retaliated against Stuxnet by releasing Shamoon. The malware destroyed over 35,000 Saudi Aramco computers, affecting business operations for months.
- December 17: Computer hacker sl1nk announced that he had hacked a total of nine countries' SCADA systems. The proof included France, Norway, Russia, Spain, Sweden and the United States.

=== 2013 ===
- The social networking website Tumblr was attacked by hackers. Consequently, 65 million unique emails and passwords were leaked from Tumblr. The data breach's legitimacy is confirmed by computer security researcher Troy Hunt.
- August: The Yahoo! data breaches occurred. More than 3 billion users' data was leaked.

=== 2014 ===
- February 7: The bitcoin exchange Mt. Gox filed for bankruptcy after $460 million was apparently stolen by hackers due to "weaknesses in [their] system" and another $27.4 million went missing from its bank accounts.
- October: The White House computer system was hacked. It was said that the FBI, the Secret Service, and other U.S. intelligence agencies categorized the attacks "among the most sophisticated attacks ever launched against U.S. government systems."
- November 24: In response to the release of the film The Interview, the servers of Sony Pictures are hacked by a hacker group calling itself "Guardian of Peace".
- November 28: The website of the Philippine telecommunications company Globe Telecom was hacked in response to the poor internet service they were distributing.

=== 2015 ===
- June: the records of 21.5 million people, including social security numbers, dates of birth, addresses, fingerprints, and security clearance-related information, are stolen from the United States Office of Personnel Management (OPM). Most of the victims are employees of the United States government and unsuccessful applicants to it. The Wall Street Journal and The Washington Post report that government sources believe the hacker is the government of China.
- July: The servers of extramarital affairs website Ashley Madison were breached.

=== 2016 ===
- February: The 2016 Bangladesh Bank heist attempted to steal US$951 million from a Bangladesh Bank, and succeeded in getting $101 million—although some of this was later recovered.
- July 22: WikiLeaks published the documents from the 2016 Democratic National Committee email leak.
- July 29: a group suspected coming from China launched hacker attacks on the website of Vietnam Airlines.
- August 13: The Shadow Brokers (TSB) started publishing several leaks containing hacking tools from the National Security Agency (NSA), including several zero-day exploits. The leaks were ongoing until April 2017.
- September: Hacker Ardit Ferizi is sentenced to 20 years in prison after being arrested for hacking U.S. servers and passing the leaked information to members of ISIL terrorist group back in 2015.
- October: The 2016 Dyn cyberattack is being conducted with a botnet consisting of IOTs infected with Mirai by the hacktivist groups SpainSquad, Anonymous, and New World Hackers, reportedly in retaliation for Ecuador's rescinding Internet access to WikiLeaks founder Julian Assange at their embassy in London, where he has been granted asylum.
- Late 2016: Hackers steal international personal user data from the company Uber, including phone numbers, email addresses, and names, of 57 million people and 600,000 driver's license numbers of drivers for the company. Uber's GitHub account was accessed through Amazon's cloud-based service. Uber paid the hackers $100,000 for assurances the data was destroyed.
- December 2016: Yahoo! data breaches reported and affected more than 1 billion users. The data leakage includes user names, email addresses, telephone numbers, encrypted or unencrypted security questions and answers, dates of birth, and hashed passwords

=== 2017 ===
- April: The hacker group The Dark Overlord posted unreleased episodes of the television series Orange Is the New Black after failing to extort the online entertainment company Netflix.
- May: WannaCry ransomware attack started on Friday, May 12, infecting more than 230,000 computers in over 150 countries. A version of the unreleased Disney film Pirates of the Caribbean: Dead Men Tell No Tales was held for ransom, with the attackers threatening its release to the public unless the ransom was paid in Bitcoin.
- May: 25,000 digital photos and ID scans of patients of the Grozio Chirurgija cosmetic surgery clinic in Lithuania were obtained and published without consent by an unknown group demanding ransoms. Thousands of clients from more than 60 countries were affected. The breach brought attention to weaknesses in Lithuania's information security.
- June: 2017 Petya cyberattack.
- June: TRITON (TRISIS), a malware framework designed to reprogram Triconex safety instrumented systems (SIS) of industrial control systems (ICS), was discovered in a Saudi Arabian Petrochemical plant.
- August: Hackers demanded US$7.5 million in Bitcoin to stop the pre-release of HBO shows and scripts, including Ballers, Room 104, and Game of Thrones.
- May–July 2017: The Equifax breach.
- September 2017: Deloitte breach.
- December: Mecklenburg County, North Carolina computer systems were hacked. No ransom was paid.

=== 2018 ===
- March: Computer systems in Atlanta, Georgia, are seized by hackers with ransomware. The city did not pay the ransom, and two Iranians were indicted by the FBI on cyber crime charges for the breach.
- Wasaga Beach, Ontario, Canada's computer systems are seized by hackers with ransomware.
- September: Facebook is hacked, exposing the personal information of approximately 30 million users when the hackers "stole" the "access tokens" of 400,000 Facebook users. The information accessible to the hackers included users' email addresses, phone numbers, friend lists, Groups they are members of, search information, timeline posts, and names of recent Messenger conversations.
- October: West Haven, Connecticut computer systems were seized by hackers with ransomware. The city paid US$2,000 in ransom.
- November:
  - The first U.S. indictment of individual people for ransomware attacks occurred. The U.S. Justice Department indicted Faramarz Shahi Savandi and Mohammad Mehdi Shah Mansouri, who allegedly used SamSam ransomware for extortion, netting more than US$6 million in ransom payments. The companies infected with the ransomware included Allscripts, Medstar Health, and Hollywood Presbyterian Medical Center. The attacks caused victims to lose more than $30 million.
  - Marriott disclosed that its Starwood Hotel brand had been subject to a security breach.

=== 2019 ===
- March: Jackson County computer systems in Georgia were seized by hackers with ransomware. They were paid $400,000 in ransom. Albany, New York experienced a ransomware cyber attack.
- April: Computer systems in Augusta, Maine were seized by hackers using ransomware. Greenville, North Carolina's computer systems were seized using ransomware known as RobbinHood. Imperial County, California's computer systems were seized using Ryuk ransomware.
- May: Computer systems in Baltimore were seized using RobbinHood that encrypts files with a "file-locking" virus, as well as the tool EternalBlue.
- June: Riviera Beach, Florida paid approximately $600,000 in Bitcoin as ransom to hackers who seized their computers using ransomware. The hackers stole 18 hours of unreleased music from the band Radiohead, demanding $150,000 in ransom. Radiohead did not pay the ransom and instead released the music publicly.
- November: Anonymous announced that they hacked into four Chinese computer databases and donated them to data breach indexing/notification service vigilante.pw. The hack was conducted to support the 2019 Hong Kong protests, during the Hong Kong police's siege of Polytechnic University. They also brought up a possible peace plan first proposed by an Inha University professor in hopes of Korean reunification and the five key demands of the Hong Kong protest being fulfilled at once.

== 2020s ==
=== 2020 ===
- May 28: Anonymous declared a large-scale hack, three days after the murder of George Floyd. In a now-deleted video, an individual claiming to represent the group stated: "We are Legion. We do not forgive. We do not forget. Expect us." Anonymous addressed police brutality, saying they "will be exposing [their] many crimes to the world". It was suspected that Anonymous were the cause for the downtime and public suspension of the Minneapolis Police Department website and its parent site, the City of Minneapolis website.
- May: Indian national Shubham Upadhyay posed as Superintendent of Police and, using social engineering, used a free caller identification app to call and threaten K. K. Gupta, the in-charge of the Kotwali police station, in order to get his phone repaired during the COVID-19 lockdown. The attempt was foiled.
- June: Anonymous claimed responsibility for stealing and leaking a trove of documents collectively nicknamed BlueLeaks. The 269-gigabyte collection was published by a leak-focused activist group known as Distributed Denial of Secrets. The group also took down the Atlanta Police Department's website via DDoS and defaced the Brookhaven National Labs's website and a Filipino governmental webpage. They expressed support for Julian Assange and press freedom, while briefly "taking a swing" against Facebook, Reddit, and Wikipedia for having "engaged in shady practices behind our prying eyes". In the case of Reddit, they posted a link to a court document describing the possible involvement of a moderator of the subreddit r/news in an online-harassment-related case.
- June: The Buffalo police department's website was reportedly hacked by Anonymous. While the site was recovered within minutes, Anonymous tweeted again, urging that it be taken down. Minutes later, the site went down again. The group also hacked Chicago police radios to play N.W.A's song, "Fuck tha Police".
- June: Over 1,000 accounts on the multiplayer online game Roblox were hacked to display support for U.S. President Donald Trump.
- July: The 2020 Twitter bitcoin scam occurred.
- July: User credentials from writing website Wattpad were stolen and leaked on a hacker forum. The database contained over 200 million records.
- August: Indian hackers defaced Pakistani television channel Dawn News and displayed India's national flag with the message "Happy Independence Day" (referring to 15 August, Independence Day of India) at around 3:30 p.m. IST. Dawn News issued a statement saying they were investigating the matter.
- August: A large number of subreddits were hacked to post material endorsing Donald Trump. The affected subreddits included r/BlackPeopleTwitter, r/3amJokes, r/NFL, and r/PhotoshopBattles. An entity calling itself "calvin goh and Melvern" claimed responsibility for the mass defacement and also made violent threats against a Chinese embassy.
- August: The U.S. Air Force's Hack-A-Sat event was hosted at DEF CON's virtual conference, where groups such as Poland Can Into Space, FluxRepeatRocket, AddVulcan, Samurai, Solar Wine, PFS, 15 Fitty Tree, and 1064CBread competed to control a satellite in space. The Poland Can Into Space team was notable for successfully manipulating a satellite to take a picture of the moon.
- August: The website of Belarusian company "BrestTorgTeknika" was defaced by a hacker using the pseudonym "Queen Elsa", in support of the 2020–21 Belarusian protests. The site read "Get Iced Iced already" and "Free Belarus, revolution of our times", the latter alluding to a slogan used in the 2019 Hong Kong protests. The hack was announced on the r/Belarus subreddit by user "Socookre".
- August: Multiple DDoS attacks forced New Zealand's stock market to temporarily shut down.
- September: The first suspected death from a cyberattack was reported after cybercriminals hit a hospital in Düsseldorf, Germany with ransomware.
- October: A wave of botnet-coordinated ransomware attacks against hospital infrastructure occurred in the United States and was linked to Russia. State security officials and American corporate security officers were concerned that these attacks were a prelude to hacking of election infrastructure during the 2020 elections the following month, similar to incidents during the 2016 United States elections and other Russian cyberattacks; no evidence emerged that election infrastructure was targeted in 2020.
- December: A supply chain attack targeting upstream dependencies from Texas IT service provider SolarWinds resulted in wide-ranging security breaches at the U.S. Treasury and Commerce departments. White House officials did not immediately identify a culprit publicly; Reuters, citing sources "familiar with the investigation", pointed toward the Russian government. An official statement shared by Senate Finance Committee ranking member, Ron Wyden said: "Hackers broke into systems in the Departmental Offices division of Treasury, home to the department's highest-ranking officials."
- December: A bomb threat was posted from a Twitter account that appeared to have been hacked by people using the aliases "Omnipotent" and "choonkeat". The threat was directed at Aeroflot Flight 102, a passenger flight with tail number of VQ-BIL en route from Moscow to New York City. A runway at the John F. Kennedy International Airport was temporarily closed, delaying Aeroflot Flight 103, a return flight back to Moscow.
- December: Anonymous initiated "Christmas gift" defacements against multiple Russian portals, including a municipal website in Tomsk and that of a regional football club. The defacements referenced Russian opposition activist Alexei Navalny, freedom protests in Thailand and Belarus, and opposition to the Chinese Communist Party. They also held a mock award based on a Roblox game event called "RB Battles", where YouTubers Tanqr and KreekCraft--the winner and the runner up of the actual game event--were compared to Taiwan and New Zealand respectively, citing New Zealand's reported performance in fighting the COVID-19 pandemic.

=== 2021 ===
- January: The Microsoft Exchange Server data breach occurred.
- February: Anonymous announced cyberattacks on at least five Malaysian websites. Eleven individuals were arrested as suspects.
- February: The group "Myanmar Hackers" attacked several websites belonging to Myanmar government agencies, including the Central Bank of Myanmar and the military-run Tatmadaw True News Information Team. The group also targeted the Directorate of Investment and Company Administration, Trade Department, Customs Department, Ministry of Commerce, Myawady TV, and state-owned broadcaster Myanmar Radio and Television, as well as some private media outlets. A computer technician in Yangon determined that the hacks were denial-of-service attacks and that the group's motive was to protest the 2021 Myanmar coup.
- March: Cyber insurer CNA Financial, one of the largest insurance companies based in the U.S., was attacked with ransomware, causing the company to lose control of its network. The company paid US$40 million to regain control. CNA initially ignored the hackers and attempted to resolve the problem independently; after remaining locked out, CNA paid the ransom within a week. CNA's investigation reported that cyberattack group Phoenix had used Phoenix Locker malware, a variant of the Hades ransomware used by the Russian criminal hacking group, Evil Corp. The malware encrypted 15,000 devices on the network, as well as the computers of employees working remotely while logged into the company's VPN at the time of the attack.
- April: The personal information of over 500 million Facebook users—including information on 32 million in the U.S.—was discovered posted on a hackers' website. Facebook claimed that the information was from a 2019 breach and that the company had already taken mitigation measures; however, the company declined to say whether it had notified the affected users of the breach.
- April: The Ivanti Pulse Connect Secure data breach, involving unauthorized access to the networks of high-value targets since at least June 2020 via CVE-2021-22893 across the U.S. and some E.U. nations, was reported. The breach was attributed to the use of vulnerable proprietary software.
- May: Operations of the U.S. Colonial Pipeline were interrupted by a ransomware cyberattack.
- May 21: Air India was subjected to a cyberattack in which the personal details of approximately 4.5 million customers were compromised, including passport and credit card details, birth dates, names and ticket information.
- July 22: Saudi Aramco data was leaked by a third-party contractor who demanded a US$50 million ransom. Saudi Aramco confirmed the incident after a hacker posted on a dark web forum on June 23 that he had stolen one terabyte of data concerning employees and the locations of oil refineries.
- August: T-Mobile reported that data files containing information from approximately 40 million current, former, or prospective customers—including first and last names, dates of birth, Social Security numbers, and driver's license/ID information—were compromised.
- September and October: The 2021 Epik data breach occurred. Anonymous obtained and released over 400 gigabytes of data from the domain registrar and web hosting company Epik. The data was shared in three releases between September 13 and October 4. The first release included domain purchase and transfer details, account credentials and logins, payment histories, employee emails, and unidentified private keys. The hackers claimed they had obtained "a decade's worth of data", including all customer data and records for every domain ever hosted or registered through the company, along with poorly encrypted passwords and other sensitive data stored in plaintext. The second release contained bootable disk images and API keys for third-party services used by Epik; the third contained additional disk images and archived data belonging to the Republican Party of Texas, an Epik customer.
- October 6: An anonymous 4chan user reportedly hacked and leaked the source code of Twitch, as well as information on how much the streaming service had paid to nearly 2.4 million streamers since August 2019. Source code from nearly 6,000 GitHub repositories was also leaked. The 4chan user described it as "part one" of a much larger release.
- November and December: On November 24, Chen Zhaojun of Alibaba's Cloud Security Team reported a zero-day vulnerability—later dubbed Log4Shell—involving arbitrary code execution in the Java logging framework software Log4j. The report was privately disclosed to the project developers of Log4j at The Apache Software Foundation on November 24. On December 8, Zhaojun contacted the developers again, detailing how the vulnerability was being discussed in public security chat rooms and was already known to some security researchers, and urged the team to fix the vulnerability in the official release version of Log4j. Early exploitations were noticed on Minecraft servers on December 9; however, forensic analysis indicates that Log4Shell may have been exploited as early as December 1 or 2. Due to the ubiquity of devices using Log4j software (hundreds of millions) and the simplicity in exploiting the vulnerability, it is considered one of the largest and most critical vulnerabilities ever discovered. Big names in security hacking helped in regaining control over server, like Graham Ivan Clark, and Elhamy A. Elsebaey. A portion of the vulnerability was fixed in a patch distributed on December 6, three days before the vulnerability was publicly disclosed.

=== 2022 ===
- February: The German Chaos Computer Club reported more than 50 data leaks. Government institutions and companies from various business sectors were affected. In total, researchers gained access to over 6.4 million personal data records, as well as terabytes of log data and source code.
- March: In response to the Russian invasion of Ukraine, Anonymous carried out numerous cyberattacks against computer systems in Russia, including one against Roskomnadzor.
- March 23: Hackers compromised the Ronin Network, stealing approximately US$620 million in Ether and USDC. A total of 173,600 Ether and 25.5 million USDC tokens were stolen in two transactions. It took the company six days to detect the breach. As of May 2026, the hack remains the largest breach in the cryptocurrency sector by dollar value. The incident further depressed the value of SLP. On April 8, Sky Mavis said it expected to recover some of the funds, though it would take several years. The company raised additional venture capital and reimbursed all users affected in the hack. On April 14, the FBI issued a statement attributing the theft to the Lazarus Group and APT38, North Korean state-sponsored hacker groups. The US Treasury sanctioned the cryptocurrency address. Some of the stolen cryptocurrency was laundered through a cryptocurrency tumbler known as "Tornado Cash".
- April: Anonymous hacked Russian companies Aerogas, Forest, and Petrovsky Fort, leaking approximately 437,500 emails, which they donated to the non-profit whistleblower organization Distributed Denial of Secrets. They also leaked 446 GB of data from the Russian Ministry of Culture.
- April 19: Gijón City Council in Spain was attacked by the GERVASIA computer virus, resulting in data hijacking.
- May: Network Battalion 65 (NB65), a hacktivist group affiliated with Anonymous, reportedly hacked Russian payment processor Qiwi. A total of 10.5 terabytes of data, including transaction records and customers' credit card information, were exfiltrated. The group also infected Qiwi with ransomware and threatened to release additional customer records.
- May: During Victory Day in Russia, anti-war messages were inserted into Russian television schedules, including those of Russia-1, Channel 1, and NTV-Plus. One message read: "On your hands is the blood of thousands of Ukrainians and their hundreds of murdered children. TV and the authorities are lying. No to war."
- June: A hacker on the cybercrime forum BreachForums claimed to have leaked more than one billion personal records from the Shanghai National Police Database.

=== 2023 ===
- March: Amidst the Russian invasion of Ukraine, hackers accessed Russian television and radio stations and broadcast false warnings of an impending nuclear attack.
- October: In response to the October 7 Hamas-led attack on Israel, the Indian hacktivist group Indian Cyber Force took down the websites of the Palestinian National Bank, National Telecommunications Company, and Hamas.
- November: A cyberattack on DP World paralyzed imports and exports in Australia for several days. DP World accounts for approximately 40% of Australia's imports and exports, leading to a 30,000-container backlog; additionally, data was stolen.

=== 2024 ===
- January: Indian Cyber Force targeted the Maldives amid diplomatic tensions following derogatory social media comments made by three Maldivian ministers about Indian Prime Minister Narendra Modi. The websites of the Maldives' Home Ministry, Juvenile Court, and President's Office were defaced, and the Facebook page of the Auditor General's Office was also defaced.
- February: The XZ Utils backdoor incident occurred.
- February: The website of Burger Singh, an Indian food franchise, was hacked by the Pakistani hacker group Team Insane PK. The group defaced the website, warned Indian hackers to cease attacks on Pakistani websites, and embedded a video depicting the Pakistani Air Force.
- June: Russian hackers infiltrated Microsoft's systems, accessing staff and customer emails, leading to regulatory scrutiny and a congressional hearing. Microsoft stated that it was notifying affected customers and working to enhance its security practices in response to these vulnerabilities.
- September: Unknown hackers accessed data from the Netherlands' National Police Corps, resulting in a data breach.

=== 2025 ===
- April: 4chan was hacked by an anonymous user associated with soyjak.party, a rival imageboard website. Source code and user login data for email-registered accounts were reportedly acquired and leaked. Additionally, the previously deleted /qa/ board was restored.
- June: Iran's state television service IRIB experienced a broadcast signal intrusion by Israeli hackers, who aired footage of women protesting against the hijab and cutting their hair.
- July: Elmo's X account was hacked and used to post antisemitic messages and call on President Donald Trump to release the Jeffrey Epstein client list.

=== 2026 ===
- October: Various online services and websites across the world that use the PHP programming language went offline and underwent impromptu maintenance, following reports about the discovery of PHP2Shell, a critical vulnerability which causes arbitrary code execution when exploited.

== See also ==
- List of cyberattacks
- List of data breaches
- List of phishing incidents
