= Kilobaud =

Kilobaud may refer to:

- One thousand baud
- P.H.I.R.M., a 1980s computer hacking group originally known as Kilobaud
- Kilobaud Microcomputing, a homebrew computer magazine from the 1980s
