= Rinki Sethi =

- Education: University of California, Davis, Capella University
- Known for: Chief Information Security Officer, Vice President at Twitter, IBM

Rinki Sethi is an American technology executive who has held Chief Information Security Officer and Vice President of Information Security roles at several large companies. Sethi is currently the Chief Security Officer of Upwind Security.

== Education ==
Sethi attended Capella University from 2006 to 2007 and completed a master's degree in information security, and completed a bachelor's degree in computer science engineering from UC Davis in 2004.

== Career ==
Sethi worked at Intuit as a Director of Product Security from 2012 to 2015. She worked as VP, Security Operations at Palo Alto Networks from 2015 to 2018. She worked at IBM from October 2018 to April 2019 as the Vice President of Information Security. Sethi served as Chief Information Security Officer at Rubrik from April 2019 to September 2020. She was an Information Security Executive at IBM from 2018 to 2019.

She was vice president and Chief Information Security Officer at Twitter Inc. Sethi joined Twitter after the 2020 Twitter bitcoin scam breach which compromised accounts of then-presidential candidate Joe Biden, Kim Kardashian, Elon Musk and Microsoft co-founder Bill Gates.

She has also worked with companies like Walmart, Intuit, eBay and others as a CISO and security expert.

Sethi also serves as an advisor to several startups, including LevelOps, Authomize, and Cybersecurity organizations, including Women in Cybersecurity. Sethi was named to the board of directors of Forge Rock in August 2021.
