= My kung fu is stronger than yours =

Catchphrase

"My kung fu is stronger than yours", or "wǒ de gōng fū bǐ nǐ de gōng fū gèng qiáng" (Pinyin romanisation), is a popular cultural trope and catchphrase, originally referring to the clichéd plots of martial arts films. The phrase is also rendered as "My kung fu is better than yours", "My kung fu is stronger than your kung fu", "My kung fu is the best", etc.

== Early mentions ==
In 1976, magazine Black Belt published an article about martial artist Leo Fong, where he was quoted as saying: "The plot [of kung fu movies] is usually 'my school-is-better-than-your school' or 'your-master-killed-my-master-so-we'll-kill-yours'. Those are the basic two themes, even in some of the Bruce Lee movies. The first and second generation Chinese have still heard the legends of the kung fu masters and their exploits and exploitations".

In a 1995 interview to Black Belt martial arts instructor Ip Ching recalled a man skilled in the Eagle Claw style who around 1928 joined a martial arts school that was open to every style. The man claimed the title of chief instructor believing that "none of the instructors there had good kung fu" and told the others "your kung fu is rubbish". Ip Man was ultimately chosen to defend the others against the intruder.

== Zeke Shif ==
On December 25, 1994, the computers of computer security expert Tsutomu Shimomura in San Diego experienced an IP spoofing hacker attack. The attack was launched by Kevin Mitnick from the domain toad.com in San Francisco via a computer owned by John Gilmore. On December 27, 1994, Shimomura received a message "Damn you, my technique is the best" on the voice mail. Three days later the caller left another message, starting with a kung fu scream and saying: "Your security technique will be defeated. Your technique is no good". Shimomura's search for the hacker ultimately led him to Kevin Mitnick, but the caller was identified as phone hacker and prankster Zeke Shif. Shif later explained: "I heard that this guy named Shimomura had been hacked... So I just thought, What the hell, I'd leave some voice mails. I used to watch kung fu movies a lot".

The phrase had been attributed to Mitnick until Shif's identity was revealed. Shif also made it very clear that he had nothing to do with any hacking, or anything Mitnick had done, and that he was just making fun of kung fu movies.

== Modern culture ==
The phrase became what ZDNet called "a cultural touchstone in its own right", equating hacking with kung fu. In The X-Files episode "Unusual Suspects", the "Lone Gunmen" hackers are heard to mutter, "Your kung fu is the best". The phrase also appears in hacking context in the film The Core.

The reviews of some modern martial arts films, such as Ip Man 2, still evoke the "my kung fu is stronger than yours" trope. Two trophies in the 2011 video game Mortal Kombat are called "My Kung Fu Is Strong" and "My Kung Fu Is Stronger."
