= Vietnamese airports hackings =

Cyberattacks on Vietnam Airlines in 2016

- Date: July 29, 2016
- Type: Cyber-attack
- Participants: Allegedly Chinese Hackergoup 1937CN
- Outcome: 100 flights delay, confidential data of 411.000 members of Vietnam Airlines' frequent fliers club, Golden Lotus
- Targets: Vietnam Airlines; Tan Son Nhat International Airport; Noi Bai International Airport, Da Nang International Airport; Phu Quoc International Airport; Vietnam Football Federation; National Economics University in Vietnam

On 29 July 2016, a group suspected coming from China launched hacker attacks on the website of Vietnam Airlines with client information leaked and on flight information screens at Vietnam's 2 biggest airports, Tan Son Nhat International Airport and Noi Bai International Airport, posting derogatory messages against Vietnam and the Philippines in their territorial row against China in the South China Sea.

== Background ==
On 12 July 2016, the Permanent Court of Arbitration ruled in favor of the Philippines against China over an arbitration case concerning the disputes in the South China Sea; in its major ruling, the tribunal ruled that China has "no historical rights" based on the "nine-dash line" map. Within hours of the Permanent Court of Arbitration's unanimous rebuke of China's territorial claims in the South China Sea last week, at least 68 national and local government websites in the Philippines were knocked offline in a massive distributed denial of service (DDoS) attack.

This hack comes days after a row involving a Chinese tourist at one of the hacked airports, Tan Son Nhat International Airport. A Chinese visitor complained, that her passport was handed back with obscenities written on the page that contains a map including China's "nine-dash line", that marks China's claim to territories in the South China Sea.

== Incidents ==
According to the Civil Aviation Administration of Vietnam, at 13h46 on 29 July the IT-systems of VietJet, Vietnam Airlines to do the flight check-ins at the Tan Son Nhat International Airport were attacked and had to stop working. At 16h07', A team of self-proclaimed Chinese Hackers attacked flight information screens at Noi Bai International Airport, posting notices that state media said criticized the Philippines and Vietnam and their claims in the South China Sea., The hackers also took control of the speaker system at Noi Bai airport for a few minutes, during which the speakers broadcast a male voice distorting Viet Nam's claims over the East Sea in English. The check-ins system of Vietnam Airlines there was also attacked and had to switch to manual procedure completion, which lead to flight delays. altogether, Noi Bai airport has 30 flight, and Tan Son Nhat more than 60 flight delayed from 15 til more than an hour, affect about 2.000 passengers.

The official website of Vietnam Airlines, vietnamairlines.com, was also hacked by the same group at about 4pm the same day. The website page was replaced by the same picture that appeared on the airports’ screens. The website was back to normal at 18.30pm, however, the airlines’ customer database was stolen and made public on the internet, according to a press release from Vietnam Airlines. The airlines advised its members to change their account passwords as soon as the network system is recovered.

Another 2 webpages were also compromised, are the webpage from Vietnam Football Federation on the same day and from National Economics University (Vietnam) the next day.

On next day, 50% of the computers can check in again, but the flight information screens are still off at Noi Bai airport. The speaker system is also still not working again. At Tan Son Nhat airport the situation is similar to Noi Bai with no flight information screens and no speaker system.

== Perpetrators ==
The Chinese hacker group claimed to be the 1937CN, which is one of the biggest hacker groups in the country and has a history of hacking Viet Nam's and the Philippines’ websites in 2013 and 2015, respectively.
