= UGNazi =

Hacker group active in 2012

UGNazi (Underground Nazi Hacktivist Group) is a hacker group. The group conducted a series of cyberattacks, including social engineering, data breach, and denial-of-service attacks, on the websites of various organizations in 2012. Two members of UGNazi were arrested in June 2012; one was incarcerated. In December 2018, two members of UGNazi were arrested in connection with a murder in Manila.

== Attacks ==
In January 2012, UGNazi defaced the website of Ultimate Fighting Championship in response to the UFC's support of the Stop Online Piracy Act. On April 24, 2012, UGNazi performed distributed denial-of-service attacks on the websites of the Central Intelligence Agency and the Department of Justice in protest of the Cyber Intelligence Sharing and Protection Act.

In May 2012, after compromising a database belonging to the Washington Military Department, UGNazi leaked sensitive DNS information used by the US state of Washington. They also leaked the account details of about 16 users, consisting of usernames and password hashes, including those of the website's administrator. UGNazi performed a social engineering attack on web host billing software developer WHMCS. A member of the group called WHMCS' hosting provider, impersonating a senior employee. They gained root access to WHMCS's web server and leaked WHMCS's SQL database, website files, and cPanel configuration. The leaked database contained about 500,000 stored credit card numbers.

On June 4, 2012, UGNazi targeted 4chan with a DNS hijacking attack through a vulnerability in Cloudflare's use of Google's two-factor authentication system, redirecting visitors to UGNazi's Twitter account. UGNazi attacked the non-profit organization Wounded Warrior Project and released the Project's database on June 6, 2012. In June of 2012, the leader of UGNazi stole the information of over 411,000 credit cards and compromised over 47 companies and government organizations estimating to be around $205 million. On June 8, 2012, UGNazi hacked the website of Wawa Inc and defaced their webpage. On June 21, 2012, UGNazi claimed they took popular social media website Twitter down for two hours via a denial of service attack. Sam Biddle of Gizmodo disputed the veracity of the claim.

UGNazi hacked into the Twitter accounts of Shirley Phelps-Roper on December 17, 2012, and Fred Phelps Jr. on December 19, 2012, in opposition to the Westboro Baptist Church's planned protest following the Sandy Hook Elementary School shootings.

In January 2021, Parler CEO John Matze alleged to Fox News that UGNazi was actively working to facilitate targeted harassment of himself and his family following the temporary take-down of Parler, a far-right social network implicated in the 2021 storming of the United States Capitol.

=== Arrests and sentencing ===
Mir Islam ("Josh the God") and Eric Taylor ("Cosmo the God") of UGNazi were arrested on June 26, 2012 as a result of Operation Card Shop, a Federal Bureau of Investigation investigation into identity theft and credit card fraud. Islam was apprehended in Manhattan after he attempted to withdraw money using a stolen ATM card. On November 7, 2012, Taylor was sentenced in juvenile court in Long Beach, California. Taylor pleaded guilty to multiple felonies, including credit card fraud, identity theft, bomb threats, and online impersonation, in exchange for a probation. The terms of the plea placed him on probation until his 21st birthday, restricted his internet access, and required him to forfeit seized assets.

== Additional criminal activity ==
On December 24, 2018, members Troy Woody ("Osama the God") and Islam were arrested in Manila on murder charges related to the death of Tomi Masters, Woody's girlfriend. Woody and Islam dumped a box containing Masters's body in the Pasig River. Both members of UGNazi confirmed that they handled the box, but individually denied killing Masters. Woody and Islam pleaded not guilty to the charges on February 11, 2019, and the trial was scheduled for March 13. In August 2019, during the trial, a ride-hailing driver testified that he had given a ride to Woody and Islam to the Pasig River where they discarded the box later discovered to contain Masters's body.

In 2023, while incarcerated in the Metro Manila District Jail, Woody and Islam, along with an ISIS sympathizer in Los Angeles named Adam Iza (aka Ahmed Faiq and Iza the God), were accused of an organized plot to commit crimes involving kidnapping, attempted murder, robbery, and cyber terrorism. A target of their conspiracy was actor Enzo Zelocchi, who filed a federal suit under RICO and the Computer Fraud and Abuse Act. Several members of the Los Angeles Sheriff's department were also implicated.
