= P.H.I.R.M. =

20th-century hacker group

- Formation: 1983
- Dissolved: 1990
- Purpose: Hacker think tank
- Location: United States
- Origin: United States
- Founders: Archangel; Blade Runner; Jack The Ripper; Systematic; The Stingray
- Products: Thief's World BBS and many others
- Formerly called: KILOBAUD

The PHIRM was an early hacking group which was founded in the early 1980s. First going by the name of "KILOBAUD", the firm was reorganized in 1985 to reflect Airwolf, a favorite television show of the time. By the mid-1980s The PHIRM was sysopping hundreds of boards. Some of the more notable boards included Thieves' Underground sysoped by Jack The Ripper, Angel's Nest sysoped by Archangel, World's Grave Elite sysoped by Sir Gamelord, and SATCOM IV. The PHIRM broke up in 1990, voluntarily, stating that after the Legion of Doom arrests that they had become too high-profile.

In 1985 a Phrack magazine article brought the group into the public eye, and they began to take on new members. In 1987 two of the founders, Archangel and Stingray, co-authored a report on Cleveland's Free-net. In 1989 the group published a definitive guide to breaking security on Bank of America home banking systems. This brought a great deal of scrutiny on the group and there were arrests. At the time of the break-up of the PHIRM, however, there were still over 100 members.

The PHIRM was the last of the "old school" (1980s) hacker groups to disband. Most of the membership disappeared. Others went on to start their own groups.

== Founding members ==
- Archangel
- Blade Runner
- Jack The Ripper
- Systematic
- The Stingray
- Sir Gamelord
- Meo Dino
- Chris TC Wilson aka Night Crawler

== Later members ==
- Meo Dino
- Dark Creaper
- The Wiz
- Baron Harkonnen
- Jimmy Jacker
- Electel
- King Blotto
- Da_K3yb0ard_c0w_b0y
- pef (later AnonymousPEF)
