= List of Tor onion services =

This is a categorized list of notable onion services (formerly, hidden services) accessible through the Tor anonymity network. Defunct services and those accessed by deprecated V2 addresses are marked.

== Archive, Index and Torrent ==
- archive.today – A web archiving site, founded in 2012, that saves snapshots on demand
- Demonoid – Torrent
- Internet Archive – A web archiving site
- KickassTorrents (defunct) – A BitTorrent index
- Sci-Hub (V2) – Search engine which bypasses paywalls to provide free access to scientific and academic research papers and articles.
- The Pirate Bay – A BitTorrent index
- Z-Library – Many instances exist.

== Commerce ==
- Agora (defunct)
- AlphaBay (defunct)
- Archetyp (defunct)
- Atlantis (defunct)
- Black Market Reloaded (defunct)
- Dream Market (defunct)
- Evolution (defunct)
- Hansa (defunct)
- Hydra market (defunct)
- Sheep Marketplace (defunct)
- Silk Road (seized by FBI)
- The Farmer's Market (defunct)
- TheRealDeal (defunct)
- Utopia (defunct)
- White House Market (defunct)

== Communications ==
- OpenPGP

=== Messaging ===
- Briar (software) – uses onion services as address when message medium is internet
- Cryptocat (defunct)
- Keybase
- Ricochet (software) – uses Tor network by default for message sending and receiving
- TorChat (defunct)

=== Email providers ===
- Bitmessage.ch (defunct)
- Guerrilla Mail (V2)
- Mailbox.org
- Proton Mail
- Riseup
- SIGAINT (defunct)
- Tor Mail (defunct)

=== IRC ===
- Libera Chat

== Educational ==
- HackThisSite

== Events ==
- Debian Conference
- DEF CON

== File storage ==
- ProtonDrive
- Freedom Hosting (defunct) – Formerly the largest Tor-specific web host, until the arrest of its owner in August 2013.

== Financial ==
- Blockchain.info (V2)– A popular bitcoin blockchain explorer service
- Helix (defunct)

== Government ==
- Central Intelligence Agency
- National Police and Public Prosecution Service of the Netherlands (V2) – An official hidden service about darknet market takedown operations
- The Foreign Intelligence Service of the Russian Federation – The address is only for whistleblowing via Securedrop.

== Hidden services directories, hosting, portals, and information ==
- 1.1.1.1 – DNS by Cloudflare
- Mullvad – VPN provider based in Sweden
- Njalla – Domain register, hosting and VPN provider
- Certbot
- The Hidden Wiki – ambiguously forked
- ToSDR (defunct) – website tracking the terms of service of other websites

== News and document archives ==
- BBC News
- Bellingcat
- BuggedPlanet (V2)
- BuzzFeed News (V2)
- Current Time TV
- DeepDotWeb (defunct)
- Deutsche Welle
- Die Tageszeitung – German daily, only SecureDrop address
- Doxbin (defunct)
- I'lam Foundation (defunct)
- It's Going Down
- ProPublica
- Radio Free Asia (V2)
- Radio Free Europe/Radio Liberty
- Shahada News Agency
- The Guardian
- The Intercept
- The New York Times (defunct)
- Voice of America

== Operating systems ==
- Debian (static Web content and package repositories)
- DivestOS – Security and privacy-focused LineageOS fork
- Qubes OS – Security-focused desktop operating system
- Whonix – Debian-based security distribution

== Whistleblowing / Drop sites ==
SecureDrop and GlobaLeaks software is used in most of these whistleblowing sites. These are secure communications platform for use between journalists and sources. Both software's websites are also available as an onion service. Websites that use secure drop are listed in a directory.

- 2600: The Hacker Quarterly
- ABC News
- Aftenposten
- Al Jazeera Media Network
- Bloomberg News and Bloomberg Law
- CBC News
- CNN International
- Dagbladet
- Distributed Denial of Secrets
- Financial Times
- Forbidden Stories
- HuffPost
- Lawrence Lessig
- NawaatLeaks (V2) – An Arabic whistleblowing initiative operated by Nawaat
- NRK
- Politico
- Reuters
- Süddeutsche Zeitung
- TechCrunch
- Independent Media Center
- The Globe and Mail
- The Washington Post
- Toronto Star
- TV 2 (Denmark)
- Vice Media
- Whistleblower Aid
- Filtrala – A Spanish whistleblowing initiative operated by Associated Whistleblowing Press
- Ljost – An Icelandic whistleblowing initiative operated by Associated Whistleblowing Press
- Die Tageszeitung – German daily
- ProPublica
- The Guardian
- The Intercept
- The Markup
- New York Times
- The New Yorker
- WildLeaks – A wildlife-crime whistleblowing initiative operated by Elephant Action League
- WikiLeaks (defunct)

== Nonprofit organizations ==
- Amnesty International
- Courage Foundation (defunct)
- Electronic Frontier Foundation
- FragDenStaat
- Freedom of the Press Foundation
- Front Line Defenders
- La Quadrature du Net (V2)
- Privacy International
- Telecomix (V2, defunct)
- The Tor Project

== Pornography ==
- Boystown (defunct)
- Childs Play (defunct)
- Lolita City (defunct)
- Playpen (defunct)
- Welcome to Video (defunct)
- Kidflix (defunct)
- Pornhub

== Search engines ==
- Ahmia
- Brave Search
- BTDigg (defunct)
- DuckDuckGo
- Grams (defunct)
- Kagi
- MetaGer
- Searx (defunct) – Individual instances use onion address
- SearXNG
- Startpage.com

== Services ==
- BusKill

== Social media and forums ==
- 8chan – An imageboard
- Dark0de (defunct)
- Dread
- Facebook onion address – Facebook
- HackBB (defunct)
- Kiwifarms
- Reddit
- Russian Anonymous Marketplace (defunct)
- The Hub (defunct)
- Tor Carding Forum (defunct)
- Twitter (defunct)

== Software ==
- Brave
- F-Droid
- Guardian Project
- Mailpile (V2)
- OnionShare

== See also ==
- Darknet
- Tor2web Clearnet-to-hidden-service software

== Note ==
- To access onion links the .onion may be replaced with ".tor2web.io". However it's strongly recommended to use official Tor Browser or Onion Browser to browse these links.
