= Online drug trafficking =

Illegal drug trade via the Internet

Darknet markets are used to buy and sell controlled substances online. Some drug traffickers use encrypted messaging tools to communicate with drug mules or potential customers.

== History ==
the first online marketplace for controlled drugs was the The Farmer's Market (formerly Adamflowers) which was active from (or before) 2006 to 2012.

The dark web site Silk Road, which started operations in 2011, was the second online marketplace for drugs. It was permanently shut down in October 2013 by the FBI and Europol. After Silk Road 2.0 went down, Silk Road 3 Reloaded emerged, however it was just an unrelated darknet market named Diabolus Market that launched in 2014, that used the Silk Road name in order to get more exposure from the Silk Road brand's earlier success, In 2015, they launched another marketplace called “Crypto Market”, which was a clone of Silk Road 3 and was basically used as a backup market because the main marketplace had undergone long-term maintenance. Crypto Market was publicly listed and linked to on DeepDotWeb and related sites, whereas Silk Road 3 was not because the operators of many darknet directories believed that any market calling itself “Silk Road” after the seizure of the second Silk Road, was nothing more than a scam trying to capitalize on the most widely known darknet market, Silk Road 3 was back in operation once again in early 2017 when Crypto Market was put under-long term maintenance, and shut down in an exit scam sometime in mid-2017.

Darknet markets have had a rise in traffic in recent years for many reasons, such as the anonymous purchases and often a system of rviews by other buyers. There are many ways in which darknet markets can financially drain individuals. Vendors and customers alike go to great lengths to keep their identities a secret while online. Commonly used tool for hiding their online presence include virtual private networks (VPNs), Tails, and the Tor Browser. Darknet markets entice customers by making them feel comfortable. Although people can easily knet market Sio a Tor browser, actually gaining access to an illicit market is not as simple as typing it in on a search engine, as one would wi h Google. Darkinrkets have special links that change frequently, ending in .onion as opposed to the typical .com, .net, and .org domain extensions. To add to privacy, the most prevalent currencies on these markets are Bitcoin and Monero, which allows transactions to be anonymous.

== Problems ==
A problem that marketplace users sometimes face is exit scamming. In cases of individual vendors, a vendor with a high rating acts as if they are selling on the market and has users pay for products they never receive. The vendor then closes their account after receiving money from multiple buyers and never sending what was paid for. Any vendor on a darknet market, all of which are involved in illegal activities, has no reason not to engage in exit scamming when they no longer want to be a vendor. In 2019, an entire market known as Wall Street Market allegedly exit scammed, stealing $30 million in bitcoin.

The FBI has cracked down on these markets. In July 2017, the FBI seized Alphabay, which re-opened in August 2021 under the control of DeSnake, one of the original administrators, though, shut down (likely an exit scam) in 2023. Investigators pose as buyers and order products from darknet vendors in the hope that the vendors leave a trail the investigators can follow. In one case an investigator posed as a firearms seller, and for six months people purchased from them and provided home addresses. The FBI was able to make over a dozen arrests during this six-month investigation. Another crackdown targeted vendors selling fentanyl and opiates. With thousands of people dying each year due to drug overdose, investigators have made internet drug sales a priority. Many vendors do not realize the extra criminal charges that go along with selling drugs online, such as money laundering and illegal use of the mail. In 2019, a vendor was sentenced to 10 years in prison after selling cocaine and methamphetamine under the name JetSetLife. But despite the large amount of time investigators spend tracking down people, in 2018 only 65 suspects who bought and sold illegal goods on some of the biggest markets were identified. Meanwhile, thousands of transactions take place daily on these markets.

== Online illicit drug vendors ==
An online illicit drug vendor is an online vendor that sells illicit drugs. They are known to sell illicit drugs including recreational psychoactive drugs and performance-enhancing drugs (PEDs), among others. Online illicit drug vendors are known to operate both on the dark web and on the clear web. They may sell explicitly illegal controlled substances or may sell legal designer drugs. Hundreds of online illicit drug vendors are known to exist. They have been described by experts as a concerningly accessible, easy, and inexpensive way of obtaining drugs.
