= Incognito Market =

Defunct darknet market active from 2020 to 2024

- Website type: Darknet market
- Available in: English
- Dissolved: 2024
- Owner: Rui-Siang Lin
- Creator: Rui-Siang Lin
- Website: incognito2sjotqmbkys7wivkpq7d4a4tkpweoiqefk7mpf7uvyfalad.onion ^{(Accessing link help)} (offline)
- Commercial: Yes
- Registration: Optional
- Users: 400,000 users, 1,800 vendors
- Launched: October 2020
- Current status: Defunct

Incognito Market was a darknet market active from 2020 to 2024. Incognito Market formed in October 2020. Since that time, and through its closing in March 2024, Incognito Market processed more than $105 million worth of illicit drugs, including more than 1,000 kilograms (2,200 lb) of cocaine, over 1,000 kilograms (2,200 lb) of methamphetamines, hundreds of kilograms of other narcotics, and more than 4 kilograms (8.8 lb) of purported “oxycodone,” some of which were laced with fentanyl. The market had about 1,800 vendors and more than 400,000 customer accounts. According to the FBI, it facilitated about 640,000 narcotics transactions.

== History ==
In the beginning of 2024, Darknetlive was sold to the admin of the Incognito market. The admin purchased it as part of a plan to commit an exit scam.

In 2023, an undercover FBI agent bought from Incognito Market counterfeit oxycodone tablets which were later discovered as Fentanyl

== Operator ==
The owner of Incognito Market, Taiwanese national Rui-Siang Lin (known online as "Pharoah"), was arrested in May 2024 and pleaded guilty in December 2024 to money laundering, conspiring to distribute narcotics, and conspiring to sell adulterated and misbranded medication. In February 2026 he was sentenced to 30 years in prison and ordered to forfeit about $105 million.

== Extortion and exit scam ==
In March 2024, after reportedly carrying out an exit scam that left users unable to withdraw funds, the market's administrators began extorting vendors and buyers, threatening to publish order records and cryptocurrency transaction IDs unless they paid fees of between $100 and $20,000.
