= Dread (forum) =

Online discussion forum hosted on the dark web

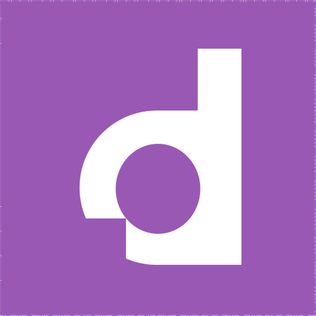

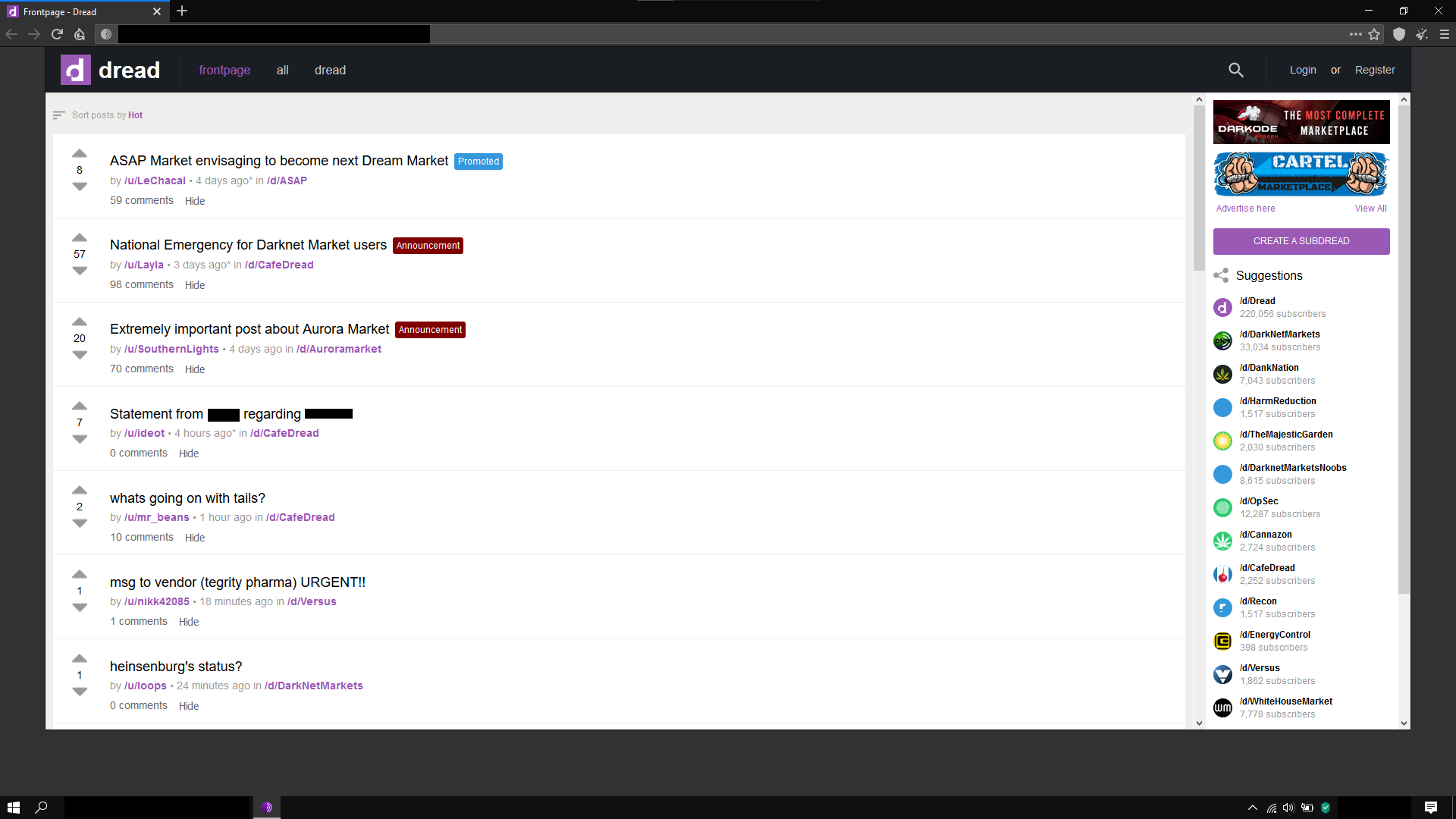
- The home page of dread (May 2021)
- Website type: Dark web forum (Dark web forum)
- Available in: English
- Owners: HugBunter and Paris
- Creator: HugBunter
- Website: dreadohblesmagfagqup24vw7catlvmqhhce5itz7wxr4vffgemjzaad.onion ^{(Accessing link help)} (active) dreadlandswkysea676lnblidg3ienxnu2ilzcegxzt3v4hwkhmqz7id.onion (defunct) dreadytofatroptsdj6io7l3xptbet6onoyno2yv7jicoxknyazubrad.onion (defunct)
- Registration: Optional
- Users: 121,194 (2019) 238,200 (November 2022) 675,000 (October 2026)
- Launched: 2018; 8 years ago
- Current status: Online (.onion only)
- Written in: PHP

Dread is a Reddit-like dark web discussion forum featuring news and discussions around darknet markets. The administrator as of the website go by the aliases of Paris and HugBunter.

== History ==
Dread is a popular community hub which has been described as a "Reddit-style forum" and emerging after the takedown of DeepDotWeb for discussion around market law enforcement activity and scams. It was launched on February 2018 and came to prominence in 2018 after Reddit banned several discussion communities about darknet markets, rapidly reaching 12,000 registered users within three months of being launched, and 14,683 users by June 2018.

In September 2019, HugBunter's dead man's switch was triggered, accompanied by a weeks-long absence, signifying the temporary loss of control over the site. The site would be reinstated in November, with a revamped user interface, and remains active as of October 2026. It became known that the cause of the outage was a server failure, according to HugBunter, despite rumors being circulated by forum users concerning a potential compromising from a third party or law-enforcement authority. On the 5th October 2026, a security incident happened where the private key of the main onion service was leaked by accident by Paris, as a result the old domain was hijacked on the same day by a third-party. On the 7th October 2026, HugBunter posted a PGP signed message on the /d/Dread subforum, stating that a zero-day vulnerability in their load balancer allowed hackers to recover the private keys of the main onion service and an alternate one that was also later hijacked.

== Activities ==
In May 2019, a moderator of Wall Street Market posted its hidden IP address to Dread, potentially leading to its exit scam and seizure shortly after. Stolen data is sometimes sold via Dread. /d/DrugManufacture on the site provides in-depth guides around manufacture of drugs. The shutdown of Dream Market was announced on Dread in March 2019. Major denial-of-service attacks have been launched against Dread and other markets exploiting a vulnerability in the Tor protocol.

Dread functions as the primary place for darknet markets in which the admins of darknet markets maintain official presence on it, with most darknet markets having official subdreads (sub-forums).

== See also ==
- The Dark Net
- Silk Road (marketplace)
- r/DarkNetMarkets
- DrugHub
- DeepDotWeb
- AlphaBay
