= Archetyp Market =

Seized darknet marketplace

Archetyp
- Logo used from 2020
- Website type: Darknet market
- Available in: English
- Dissolved: June 2025
- Area served: Europe and worldwide
- Owners: ASNT, later identified as Marc Hegemeister
- Products: Drugs
- Website: archetyp.cc (defunct); 4pt4axjgzmm4ibmxplfiuvopxzf775e5bqseyllafcecryfthdupjwyd.onion ^{(Accessing link help)} (defunct)
- Commercial: Yes
- Registration: Required
- Users: 612,000
- Launched: May 2020
- Current status: Seized

Archetyp or Archetyp Market was a darknet market that was launched in May 2020. It operated on the Tor network and was therefore only accessible via an onion browser. All transactions were conducted using Monero, a cryptocurrency designed to be private. Archetyp was an online drug marketplace, and only accepted drug-related listings.

It was seized in June 2025 by the BKA, the German federal police agency.

== History ==
In an interview with German website tarnkappe.info, the founder of the market stated that they grew up in a deprived area and first encountered drugs at a young age. After trying LSD at age 20, they reflected on their life of alcohol abuse and drug-related anti-social behavior and realized that it did not fit with the prosocial desires they had as a child. They were initially impressed by the libertarian philosophy of the Silk Road marketplace, but after its seizure, many of the replacement markets they found were focused more on profit than this libertarian philosophy. Because of this, they decided to set up Archetyp, and to support the European drug scene and advocate for drug liberalization.

At the May 2023 IEEE Conference on Computer Communications, researchers presented an onion service popularity estimation algorithm which found that, after accounting for phishing sites, Archetyp Market was the most popular onion service website on Tor.

According to a February 2024 study in the journal International Criminal Justice Review, most of the users of the previously-popular darknet market Flugsvamp migrated to Archetyp following security issues and allegations of fraud at Flugsvamp.

Research by the National Drug and Alcohol Research Centre at the University of New South Wales found that Archetyp was the largest of the 11 darknet markets monitored in May 2024 by number of listings, with an average of 8,607. This was up from January 2024, when Archetyp came fourth after Incognito, Bohemia and Nemesis (which all closed before May).

=== Seizure ===
Archetyp was seized by the BKA in June 2025 in an operation called Operation Deep Sentinel. The operation was a collaborative effort by the European Union and six countries.

A 30-year-old German national suspected of running the site was arrested in Barcelona on June 11. He is accused of being ASNT. The server infrastructure was hosted in a data center in the Netherlands and was also seized.

One moderator and six of the top vendors on the platform were also arrested and assets worth 7.8 million euros were seized in the process.

In August 2026 German prosecutors charged the alleged operator, who had since been extradited to Germany. They accused him of running the platform from July 2020 and of operating it from June 2022 as part of an organized criminal group with at least two other people. According to prosecutors, this generated around 20 million euros in revenue. They said about 2.3 million orders were processed through the site between November 2022 and June 2025. If convicted, he faces up to 15 years in prison.

The onion site and the clearnet site were both replaced with a seizure banner that links to the investigative operation's website. The linked site hosts a video addressed to the "underground economy".

The banner displays the badges of the agencies that contributed to the operation, including the German BKA, the Dutch Politie, the Spanish National Police, the Romanian Police, the American Department of Justice, the Swedish Police Authority, and the EU agencies of Europol and Eurojust.

== Products ==
A listing on the website for 3-MMC

Archetyp was founded in May 2020 as an online marketplace to facilitate the illicit drug trade. It did not host other black market listings such as those for firearms or prostitution.

The website operated in a format similar to other e-commerce platforms, with product listings, ratings, and user profiles. Vendors offered a range of drugs, including cannabis, cocaine, MDMA, LSD, benzodiazepines, and methamphetamine. Substances could be searched for by category, place of origin, and destination.

On the page for each listing, users could pick a predefined quantity of the drug chosen by the vendor, typically measured in grams or number of pills, and proceed to checkout.

The products were primarily shipped from European countries, especially from the Schengen Area. They were however American vendors and consumers, as well as distributors from China and Mexico.

At the time of seizure, there was a total of 17,000 listings on the website sold by 3,200 vendors. Total trade volume exceeded 250 million euros.

== See also ==
- Silk Road (marketplace)
- Hydra Market
- Agora (online marketplace)
- Illegal drug trade
