= Agora (online marketplace) =

Defunct darknet marketplace

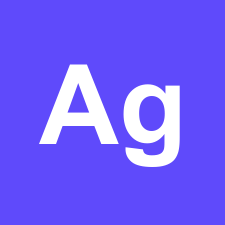
- Website type: Darknet market
- Available in: English
- Website: agorahooawayyfoe.onion (defunct)
- Commercial: No
- Registration: Required
- Launched: 2013
- Current status: Offline

Agora was a darknet market operating in the Tor network, launched in 2013 and shut down in August 2015.

Agora was unaffected by Operation Onymous, the November 2014 seizure of several darknet websites (most notably Silk Road 2.0). After Evolution closed in an exit scam in March 2015, Agora replaced it as the largest darknet market.

In October 2014 to January 2015, the art collective !Mediengruppe Bitnik explored darknet culture in an exhibition in Switzerland, The Darknet: From Memes to Onionland, displaying the purchases of the Random Darknet Shopper, an automated online shopping bot that spent $100 in Bitcoins per week on Agora. The aim was to examine philosophical questions surrounding the darknet, such as the legal culpability of a piece of software or robot. The exhibition of the robot's purchases, a landscape of traded goods that included a bag of ten 120 mg ecstasy pills "with no bullshit inside" (containing 90 mg of MDMA), was staged next door to a police station near Zürich.

In August 2015, Agora's admins released a PGP signed message announcing a pause of operations to protect the site against potential attacks that they believed might be used to deanonymize server locations:

Recently research had come [sic] that shed some light on vulnerabilities in Tor Hidden Services protocol which could help to deanonymize server locations. Most of the new and previously known methods do require substantial resources to be executed, but the new research shows that the amount of resources could be much lower than expected, and in our case we do believe we have interested parties who possess such resources. We have a solution in the works which will require big changes into our software stack which we believe will mitigate such problems, but unfortunately it will take time to implement. Additionally, we have recently been discovering suspicious activity around our servers which led us to believe that some of the attacks described in the research could be going on and we decided to move servers once again, however this is only a temporary solution.

At this point, while we don't have a solution ready it would be unsafe to keep our users using the service, since they would be in jeopardy. Thus, and to our great sadness we have to take the market offline for a while, until we can develop a better solution. This is the best course of action for everyone involved.

After the closure of Agora, most activity moved over to the darknet market AlphaBay, lasting until its shutdown by law enforcement in July 2017.
