= Farmers' market (disambiguation) =

A farmers' market (or farmers market according to the AP stylebook) is a physical retail marketplace intended to sell foods directly by farmers to consumers.

Farmers' market or farmers market may refer to:

- Farmers Market (band), a Norwegian band
- Farmer's Market (album), an album by trumpeter Art Farmer, recorded in 1956
- "Farmers Market", a song by Pulp from the album More, released in 2025
- The Farmer's Market, a former online black market for illegal drugs
- The Original Farmers Market, a marketplace in Los Angeles
- 99 Ranch Market, some stores branded as "Farmer's Market"
