= Utopia (marketplace) =

Former darknet market

- Website type: Darknet market
- Available in: English
- Website: ggvow6fj3sehlm45.onion (defunct)
- Commercial: Yes
- Registration: Required
- Current status: Offline

Utopia was a darknet market similar to The Silk Road that facilitated sale of illegal items such as narcotics, firearms, stolen bank account information and forged identity documents. Utopia was based on Black Market Reloaded and has ties to it.

== History ==
It was launched on 3 February 2014 only to be shut down by Dutch police 8 days later. Undercover agents were able to buy large amounts of ecstasy (MDMA) and cocaine. 900 Bitcoin (then worth approximately £363,000) were seized.
