= Empire Market =

Darknet market, 2018 to 2020

- Website type: Darknet market
- Available in: English
- Dissolved: August 2020
- Owners: Rahim Hamilton and Thomas Pavey
- Commercial: Yes
- Registration: Optional
- Launched: January 2018
- Current status: Defunct since 2020

Empire Market was a darknet market active from January 2018 to 2020.

In August 2020, the admins of Empire Market carried an exit scam, more than $30 Million worth of Bitcoin (at that time) was stolen in the exit scam

The admins of the website, Rahim Hamilton and Thomas Pavey were arrested in June 2024.
