= Grams (search) =

Discontinued search engine

- Website type: Darknet market search engine
- Available in: English
- Website: grams7enufi7jmdl.onion (defunct)
- Launched: 2014
- Current status: Closed in 2017

Grams was a search engine for Tor based darknet markets launched in April 2014, and closed in December 2017. The service allowed users to search multiple darknet markets for products like drugs and guns from a simple search interface, and also provided the capability for its users to hide their transactions through its bitcoin tumbler Helix.

The services used a custom API to scrape listings from several markets such as Alpha Bay and others, to return search listings. The site is described by the Global Drug Policy Observatory to have "transformed how people search the hidden web".

In May 2014 the site added Gramwords, a service similar to Google's AdWords search sponsorship system for vendors. Additionally their profile system allows for cross-market vendor contact details and reviews to be held centrally.

Later that year in June the creators released Grams Flow, a clearnet to Tor redirection service serving various dark net sites and in November, a banner advertising network for Tor sites, TorAds which has not yet had much success.

'InfoDesk' allows central content and identity management for vendors, reducing the complexity of around maintaining presences on multiple markets.

On December 9, 2017, the Grams administrator left a PGP signed message on the Reddit subreddit r/Grams stating that all Grams services, including the Helix tumbler, would be shut down on December 16, 2017.

== Helix ==
In June 2014, Grams released Helix and Helix Light, a market payment service with an integrated bitcoin tumbler. The site was also available on the clearnet via Grams Flow.

In August 2017, it was noted that an elaborate darknet phishing scam appeared as the top Google search result for "how to mix bitcoins", directing users to a fake version of the Grams Helix Light website that would steal their bitcoins.

Due to the enduring popularity of the site, and relative ease of replicating the first few digits of a .onion address, a number of illegitimate copies of the original Gram hidden service have been created. These include a scam version of flow, the search engine, and even copies of the drug marketplaces indexed. Several competing scams have replicated the "grams7e" portion of the address and are listed on links aggregators as if they are the now defunct original site. Like the Helix scam, these sites defraud unsuspecting visitors of any money or personal details entered on the fake site or fake marketplaces it linked to.

== Owner ==
On February 6, 2020, the FBI and IRS arrested an Ohio man, Larry Dean Harmon, who they alleged was the operator of Helix and Grams. Helix was said to have been partnered with AlphaBay, an illegal darknet market shut down in mid-2017. Harmon pled guilty in August 2021 and agreed to forfeit 4400 bitcoins as part of a plea deal, and faced up to 20 years imprisonment. Harmon's sentencing was initially deferred while he worked under a cooperation plea agreement, and finally in November 2024 he was sentenced to three years in prison.
