= Atlantis (market) =

Darknet market

- Website type: Darknet market
- Available in: English
- Website: atlantisrky4es5q.onion (defunct)
- Commercial: Yes
- Registration: Required
- Launched: March 2013
- Current status: Offline

Atlantis was a darknet market founded in March 2013, the third such type of market, concurrent with The Silk Road and Black Market Reloaded. It was the first market to accept Litecoin.

== Marketing ==
Shortly after launch, Atlantis deployed an aggressive marketing campaign to compete with Silk Road. To entice customers to switch allegiance, Atlantis focused its strategy on "usability, security, cheaper rates (for vendor accounts and commission), website speed, customer support, and feedback implementation". In June 2013 its startup style video attracted much media attention. The video advertised Atlantis as the "world's best anonymous online drug marketplace" and outlined offered features missing in its competitors. After this campaign, one of the site's co-founder announced that they secured more than $1 million in sales.

Shortly after Operation Onymous, the market closed with one week's notice in September 2013. Like other markets such as Black Flag, Atlantis' owner closed the site out of fear of arrest. During the trial of Ross Ulbricht, it was revealed that Mr. Ulbricht had kept a journal, with one of its final entries stating, "Atlantis shut down. I was messaged by one of their team who said they shut down because of an FBI doc leaked to them detailing vulnerabilities in Tor." There are sources, including the site's staff, who believe that the closing was outright theft, with the owners stealing its users' bitcoins.
