= Amir Taaki =

British-Iranian hacktivist (born 1988)

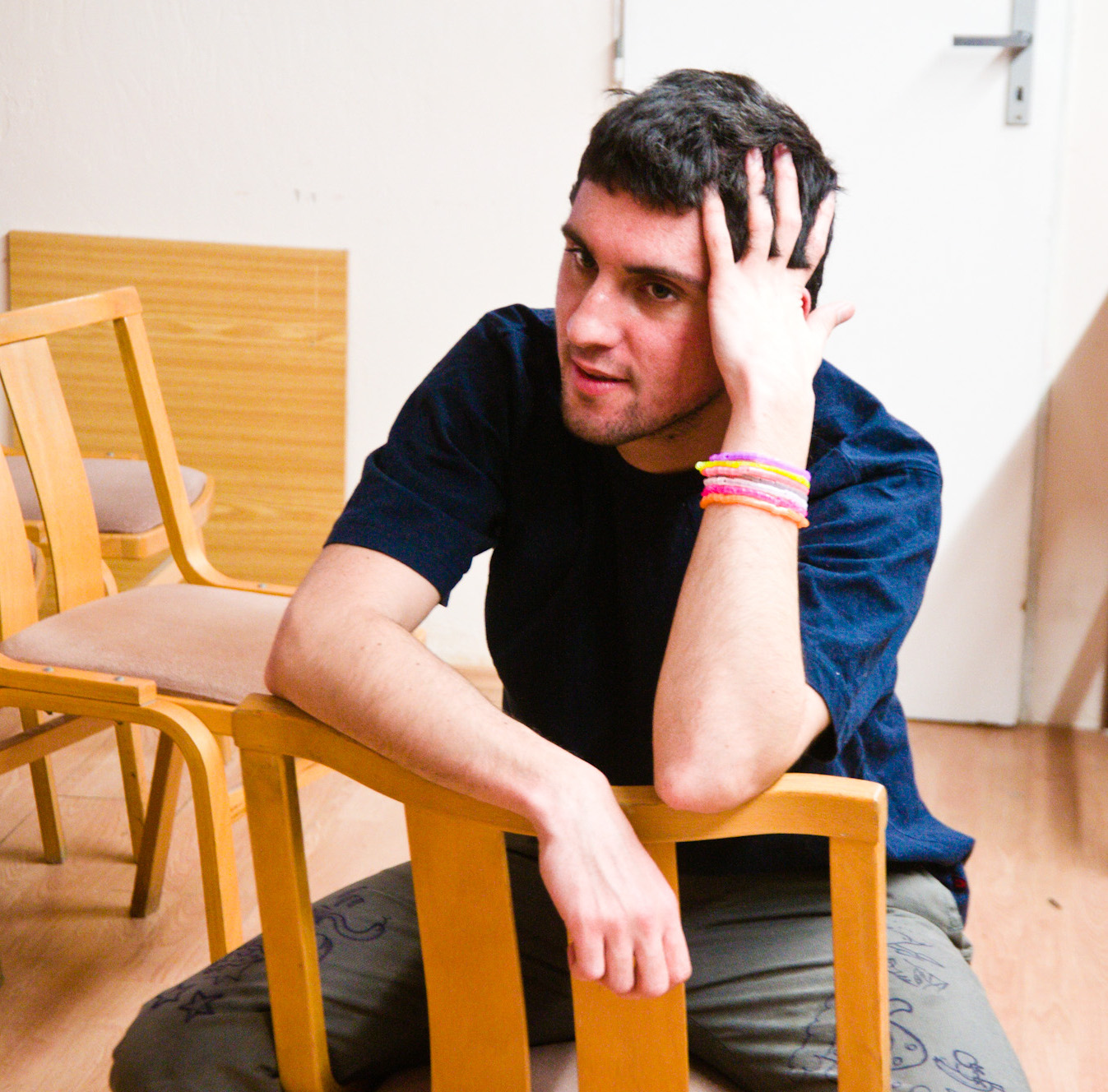
- Taaki in Bratislava, 2012
- Born: 6 February 1988 (age 38); London, United Kingdom
- Occupation: Programmer
- Military career
- Allegiance: Rojava
- Branch: YPG
- Service years: 2015
- Conflicts: Syrian Civil War
- Website: agorism.dev

Amir Taaki (Persian: امیر تاکی; born 6 February 1988) is a British-Iranian anarchist revolutionary, hacktivist, and programmer who is known for his leading role in the Bitcoin project, and for pioneering many open source projects. Forbes listed Taaki in their 30 Under 30 listing of 2014. Driven by the political philosophy of the Rojava revolution, Taaki traveled to Syria to serve in the YPG military and work in Rojava's civil society.

== Early life, family and education ==
Amir Taaki was born 6 February 1988 in London, the eldest of three children of a Scottish-English mother and an Iranian father who is a property developer. Taaki was raised in nearby Kent. From an early age Taaki took an interest in computer technology, teaching himself computer programming.

He briefly attended two British universities.

== Work and activism ==
Taaki gravitated to the free software movement. Taaki assisted in the creation of SDL Collide, an extension of Simple DirectMedia Layer, an open source library used by video game developers.

In 2009 and 2010, Taaki made his living as a professional poker player. His experience with online gambling attracted him to the Bitcoin project. At one point, he was listed among Bitcoin's main developers. He founded the first UK Bitcoin exchange, "Britcoin", which was succeeded in 2011 by a new British exchange called Intersango, in which he was a principal developer. Intersango has since closed.

In 2012, Taaki organized the first Bitcoin conference in London.

In 2014, together with Cody Wilson, he launched the Dark Wallet project after a crowdfunding run on IndieGoGo which raised over $50,000. Taaki, along with other developers from Airbitz, a Bitcoin software company, created a prototype for a decentralised marketplace, DarkMarket, in 2014, at a hackathon in Toronto, which was forked into the OpenBazaar project.

As of 2013, he resided in an anarchist squat in the former anti-G8 HQ building in London, England.

Driven by the political philosophy of the Rojava revolution, in 2015, Taaki went to Rojava (Syrian Kurdistan) to offer his skills to the revolution and served the YPG military. He had no training but spent three and a half months in the YPG military fighting on the front. He was then discharged and worked in the civil society on various projects for Rojava's economics committee.

In February 2018, Taaki created a group in Catalonia dedicated to leveraging blockchain technology to help national liberation causes such as the Catalan independence movement.

In 2023, Politico reported that Taaki was working on DarkFi, an anarchist project that aimed to allow people to form organizations that collectively raise and distribute money in complete secrecy.

Taaki appears in the Bitcoin documentary Money Electric: The Bitcoin Mystery, released in October 2024. He has publicly disagreed with the film's theory of Peter Todd as Satoshi Nakamoto.

== See also ==
- Crypto-anarchism
- Cypherpunk
