= The Hub (forum) =

Online black marketplace and cybercrime forum

- Website type: Forum
- Available in: English
- Website: thehub7xbw4dc5r2.onion ^{(Accessing link help)}
- Registration: Required

The Hub is a discussion forum on Tor hidden services on the dark web focused on darknet market reviews, cryptocurrency and security.

Second in popularity only to Reddit's /r/DarkNetMarkets, the site was launched in January 2014 as a more secure, verifiable and discreetly moderated alternative. Vendors must be verified prior to getting a vendor status on the forum. The Hub has hosted Dr. Fernando Caudevilla, 'DoctorX' as an adviser for the site's drug users who has answered more than a thousand questions in the forums of the original Silk Road and Silk Road 2.0 and the site has an ongoing harm reduction and drug awareness program.
