= Russian Anonymous Marketplace =

Defunct Russian-language darknet market

- Website type: Forum based darknet market
- Available in: Russian; English
- Launched: 2012
- Current status: Terminated

The Russian Anonymous Marketplace or RAMP was a Russian language forum with users selling a variety of drugs on the Dark Web.

With over 14,000 members, the site used Tor and used some escrow features like Silk Road-like darknet markets, but otherwise many deals took place off-site using off-the-record messaging. It is the longest lived darknet market, running from September 2012 to July 2017, inspired by the success of the Silk Road.

The administrator who went by the handle 'Darkside', claimed the site made around $250,000 a year and avoided law enforcement attention due to its predominant Russian user base and its ban on the sale of goods and services such as hacking.

From July 2017, users were unable to login due to DDOS attacks. On September 19, 2017, the Russian Ministry of Internal Affairs confirmed the site had been terminated in July.
