= Kidflix =

Defunct child pornography website

- Kidflix shortly after it was taken down by Europol
- Website type: Secret child pornography file sharing website
- Founded: 2021
- Dissolved: March 11, 2025 (shutdown by Europol)
- Country of origin: Germany
- Area served: Worldwide
- Total assets: 91,000 CSAM videos
- Users: 1,800,000+

Kidflix (portmanteau of kid and -flix, as in Netflix), was a dark web website that hosted child pornography from 2021 to 2025. Before it was closed, Kidflix was one of the largest child pornography platforms in the world, with approximately 1.8 million users worldwide logged on Kidflix between April 2022 and March 2025. Over its lifetime the site held more than 91,000 videos, averaging 3.5 uploaded every hour.

== History ==
Kidflix was created by an unnamed cybercriminal in order to make profits from uploading and sharing illegal content through the platform in 2021. Kidflix offered payment methods ranging from 6 to 180 dollars for lifetime premium access to the videos. Officials stated that the average age of users was 31, but at its extremes ranged from someone born in 2006 to someone in their 70s. However a prior history of Darknet usage was common across users.

== Crackdown ==
A Europol co-ordinated effort involving 38 countries and led by German police dismantled the site in April 2025. In Germany, police raided 96 locations, arresting 103 individual suspects. The German police was able to identify child victims of sexual abuse, as well as remove two children from the home of a site user. One person caught was a man offering their child "for games", and another was a "serial abuser" in the United States. Sixty people in the United Kingdom were identified, leading to thirty arrests. Ten Swiss nationals were also identified. Two men from Malta were arrested and charged after they were identified buying and uploading child pornography on Kidflix.

== See also ==
- List of Tor onion services
- Child abuse
- Internet pornography
