= Jimmy Zhong =

American criminal

James Zhong
- Born: James Zhong; May 24, 1990 (age 36); New Jersey
- Other name: Jimmy Zhong
- Education: University of Georgia (BS)
- Known for: Largest theft of Bitcoin in U.S. history
- Conviction: Wire fraud
- Penalty: 1 year and 1 day imprisonment

Details
- Date apprehended: November 9, 2021

James "Jimmy" Zhong (born May 24, 1990) is an American man who was convicted in 2022 for stealing over 51,680 bitcoin (then worth about $620,000; value as of 2026 approximately $3.36 billion, all time high $6.53 billion) from the online black market Silk Road between 2012 and 2014. Zhong, who was closely monitoring the early development of bitcoin, had found an error on Silk Road that allowed him to withdraw more funds than what was initially deposited. This was activated by repeatedly double-clicking the withdraw button, and further abused by using multiple accounts on the website.

Zhong managed to conceal his identity and elude detection for nearly 10 years. He lived a luxurious lifestyle, using tools such as cryptocurrency mixers to obscure the origin of the bitcoin he spent. Zhong told friends that he had mined thousands of bitcoin in the technology's early days.

Zhong initially got involved with Silk Road as an avid cocaine user. In 2016, Zhong was arrested in downtown Athens, Georgia, for possession of cocaine.

On March 13, 2019, Zhong contacted 911 to report the theft of hundreds of thousands of dollars in cryptocurrency from his residence. In September 2019, he made a mistake by transferring a small amount of stolen bitcoin to a cryptocurrency exchange that followed know-your-customer rules. This was not enough to prove Zhong was the hacker. To establish Zhong's culpability, the IRS criminal investigation division collaborated with the Athens-Clarke County Police Department, which was already probing the theft at Zhong's residence. On November 9, 2021, a raid on his Gainesville, Georgia, home resulted in the seizure of about 50,676 bitcoin, then valued at over $3.36 billion. Zhong cooperated with investigators, forfeited all of his bitcoin and pled guilty to one count of wire fraud.

In April 2023, Zhong was sentenced to a year and a day in prison.

== See also ==
- Silk Road (marketplace)
- Cryptocurrency and crime
