= Blake Benthall =

American founder of Silk Road 2.0 dark web market

Blake Benthall (born in Houston, Texas) is an American software engineer who operated the dark web narcotics marketplace Silk Road 2.0 under the pseudonym "Defcon." Benthall was arrested on November 6, 2014 by the Federal Bureau of Investigation (FBI) in San Francisco as part of Operation Onymous, a joint operation between the FBI and Europol, aimed at shutting down illegal goods trading on the dark web.

Benthall attended Florida College and moved to San Francisco in 2009. After working at several failed startups, including a short stint as an engineer at Elon Musk's SpaceX, he revived the Silk Road in 2013 after the original site was shut down by the FBI the previous year and its alleged operator, Ross Ulbricht, was arrested.

After his arrest, Benthall spent eight months in the Queens Detention Center in New York. In July 2015, he pleaded guilty to four counts, including narcotics trafficking and money laundering, and signed a cooperation agreement with the FBI. His probation, along with his FBI cooperation agreement, ended in March 2024. He now lives in Houston and is a blockchain technology entrepreneur.

== See also ==
- War on drugs
- Operation Onymous
- Cybercrime
