= TheRealDeal =

Darknet website for cybercrime hackers

- Website type: Darknet market
- Available in: English
- Website: trdealmgn4uvm42g.onion (defunct)
- Commercial: Yes
- Registration: Required
- Current status: Offline

TheRealDeal was a darknet website and a part of the cyber-arms industry reported to be selling code and zero-day software exploits.

The creators claimed in an interview with DeepDotWeb that the site was founded in direct response to the number of dark websites which have emerged during the past few years which do not actually have anything of value to sell and are just scams. The site relied on Tor and bitcoin similar to other darknet markets but required multi-signature transactions. There was speculation in the computer security community as to whether the site is a law enforcement sting operation due to apparent listing of exploits at many times below their potential market value.

In July 2015 the website was down for 24 hours at the same time as cyber crime forum Darkode was seized by the FBI and various members arrested in 'Operation Shrouded Horizon'. On 13 August in 2015 the site went offline for unknown reasons. On December 1 it announced its reopening on DeepDotWeb. The Real Deal was shut down in November 2016.

== See also ==
- WabiSabiLabi
