= Sheep Marketplace =

Darknet market

- Website type: Darknet market
- Available in: English
- Website: sheep5u64fi457aw.onion (defunct)
- Commercial: Yes
- Registration: Required
- Launched: March 2013
- Current status: Offline

Sheep Marketplace was a darknet market that launched in March 2013 and was one of the lesser known sites to gain popularity with the well publicized closure of the Silk Road marketplace later that year. It ceased operation in December 2013, when it announced it was shutting down after a vendor stole $6 million worth of users' bitcoins.

== Bitcoin theft incident ==
In December 2013 Sheep Marketplace announced that one of the site's vendors had exploited a vulnerability to steal 5,400 bitcoins, valued at about $6 million at the time. According to Forbes and The Guardian, several users reported the site had started to block withdrawals of bitcoins more than a week prior to the theft. Users furthermore suggested the site's administrators held far more than 5,400 bitcoins, pointing to records of a coincidental transfer of almost 40,000. As users in the site's forums began to complain and discuss the possibility of connivance, administrators took the forum offline.

Victims of the theft have attempted to identify the thief by sending "tagged" bitcoins to his accounts, using the public nature of bitcoin transactions to follow the coins through the blockchain. Within a couple of days of the theft, a large amount of bitcoins were noticed being processed by Bitcoin Fog, a tumbler used to launder bitcoins by shuffling them between many accounts for a small fee. The size of the transaction, 96,000 bitcoins, caused Bitcoin Fog to fail, leaving the money traceable. Not long thereafter, the last known wallet of the user who had been presumed to be the thief was found to be a wallet owned by BTC-e, a large cryptocurrency exchange. This has led to speculation that the thief sent their money to the exchange in the hope of trading the coins for alternate cryptocurrencies or moving to new wallets to further obfuscate their path.

In March 2015 Czech police arrested a man suspected to be the Sheep Marketplace thief when he paid for an expensive house entirely in bitcoins. A nine-month investigation showed that he had made $800,000 of sudden purchases. In October 2017 Tomáš Jiříkovský, the creator of Sheep Marketplace, was sentenced to serve nine years in prison for stealing bitcoins from the market's users.

In May 2016 two men from Florida, then 21-year-old students Sean Mackert and Nathan Gibson, were arrested after tracing Bitcoin transactions via Coinbase. Subsequently, the pair pled guilty to the crime of Bitcoin wire fraud on Sheep Marketplace in 2018 and are now facing a maximum prison time of up to twenty years. About $4 million worth of Bitcoin stolen by Mackert and Gibson has since been seized by the United States federal government.
