= Long firm fraud =

Financial crime

A long firm fraud (also known as a consumer credit fraud) is a crime that uses a trading company set up for fraudulent purposes; the basic operation is to run the company as an apparently legitimate business by buying goods and paying suppliers promptly to secure a good credit record. Once they are sufficiently well-established, the perpetrators purchase the next round of goods on credit, then decamp with the goods and profits from previous sales. The goods can then be sold elsewhere. The procedure needs a certain amount of money to set up, often the proceeds from another crime or a previous long firm. Sometimes an individual who does time in jail for assisting the fraud is paid for the time served. Long firm frauds have become significantly less common in recent years since it is no longer possible to operate for any length of time without leaving a significant paper trail.

The term "Long firm" has existed since the middle of the 19th century; the name may be derived from 'long-distance', but is otherwise obscure. This was originally applied to the practice of seeing goods advertised for sale in newspapers or other print media, then writing a letter to the vendor from a suitable distance, offering to buy the items along with the promise of immediate payment in the form of a posted cheque upon their delivery. The address given by the purchaser would normally be bogus, and the promised cheque would never arrive.
