= Evolution (marketplace) =

Former darknet market

- Website type: Darknet market
- Available in: English
- Owner: Verto
- Website: k5zq47j6wd3wdvjq.onion (defunct)
- Commercial: Yes
- Registration: Required
- Launched: December 2014
- Current status: Offline

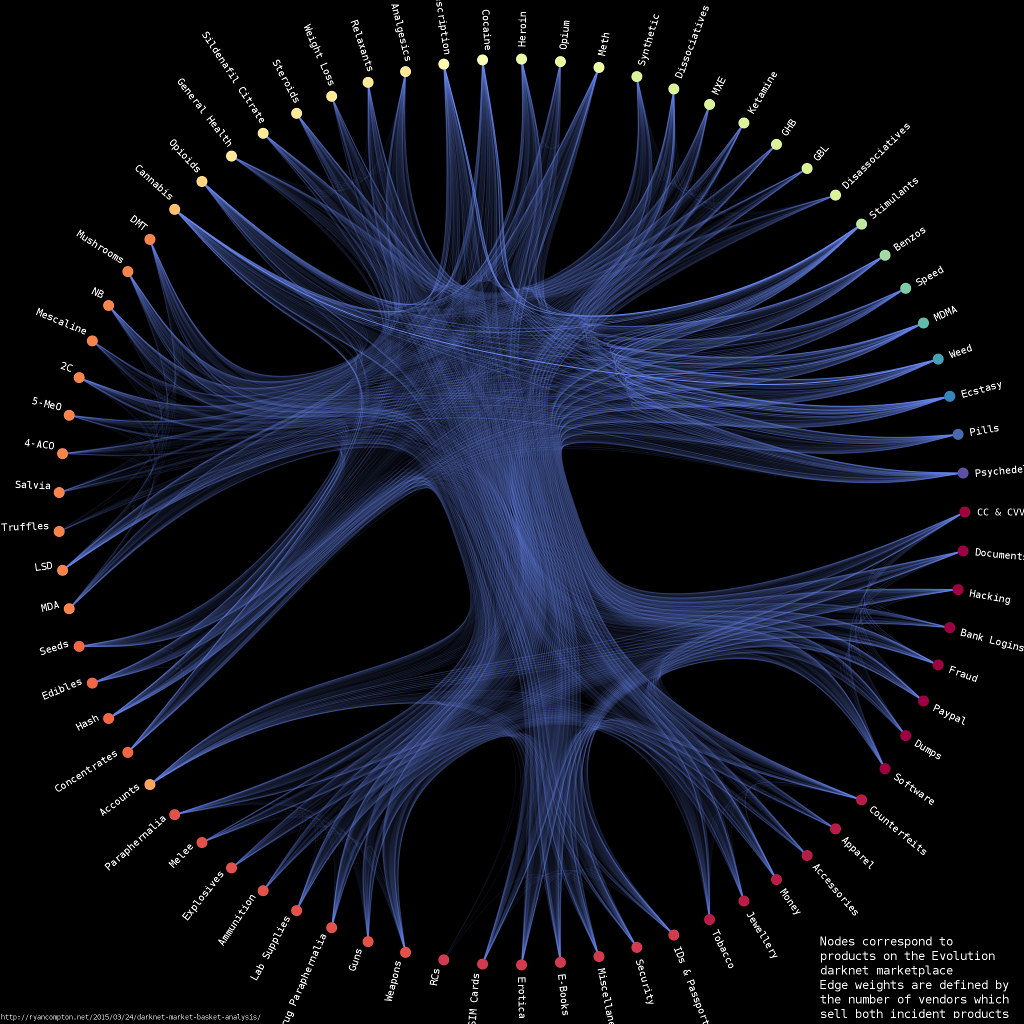
An analysis of the defunct Evolution marketplace shows the different types of products and vendors on a market.

Evolution was a darknet market operating on the Tor network. The site was founded by an individual known as "Verto" who also founded the now defunct Tor Carding Forum. Evolution was active between 14 January 2014 and mid-March 2015.

== History ==
Launched January 14, 2014, it saw rapid growth within its first several months, helped in part by law enforcement seizures of some of its competitors during the six-month-long investigation codenamed Operation Onymous. Speaking about why Evolution was not part of Operation Onymous, the head of the European police cybercrimes division said it was "because there's only so much we can do on one day." Wired estimated that as of November 2014 it was one of the two largest drug markets.

Evolution was similar to other darknet markets in its prohibitions, disallowing "child pornography, services related to murder/assassination/terrorism, prostitution, ponzi schemes, and lotteries". Where it most prominently differed was in its more lax rules concerning stolen credit cards and others kinds of fraud, permitting, for example, the wholesaling of credit card data.

== Shut down ==
In mid-March 2015, administrators froze its users escrow accounts, disallowing withdrawals, citing technical difficulties. Evolution had earned a reputation not just for its security, but also for its professionalism and reliability, with an uptime rate much higher than its competition. Partly for that reason, when the site went offline a few days later, on March 18, the user community panicked. The shut down was discovered to be an exit scam, with the operators of the site shutting down abruptly in order to steal the approximately $12 million in bitcoins it was holding as escrow.

== See also ==
- Black market
- Crypto-anarchism
- OpenBazaar
- Ross Ulbricht
- War on drugs
