= Darknetlive =

Online news outlet covering the dark web

- Screenshot Darknetlive homepage, April 2022
- Website type: Technology news and information
- Available in: English
- Website: darknetlive.link
- Commercial: no
- Current status: Defunct

Darknetlive was a news and information site covering darknet markets and other dark web activities.

In the beginning of 2024, the website was sold to the admin of the Incognito market. The admin purchased it as part of a plan to commit an exit scam. It now publishes no new news, and many features such as comments on the site have been disabled.

Regular topics include major drug dealer 'vendor' arrests, and all kinds of information surrounding darknet market activities and closures.

A part of the Blueleaks hack, an FBI document mentions that non-commercial sites such as Darknetlive are "legal gateways" for accessing darknet markets.
