= DeepDotWeb =

Darknet news website

- Website type: Technology news and information
- Available in: English
- Owners: Tal Prihar, Michael Phan
- Launched: October 2013
- Current status: Seized on May 7, 2019; 7 years ago

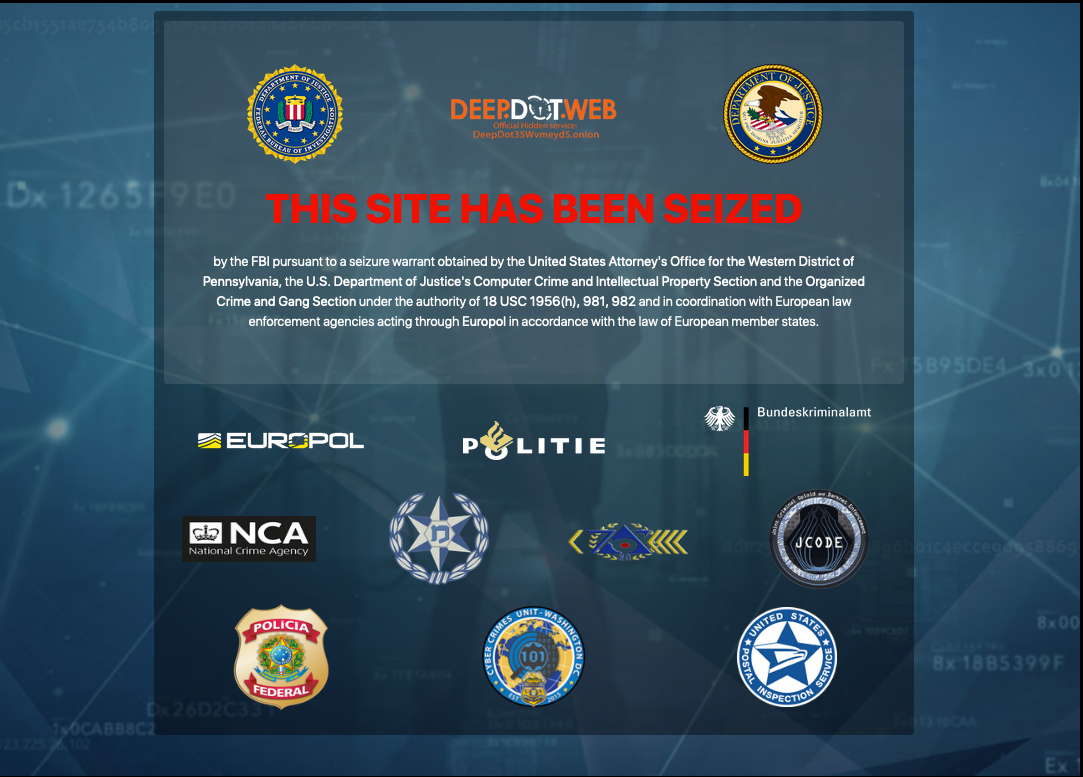
Lock screen when opening the page

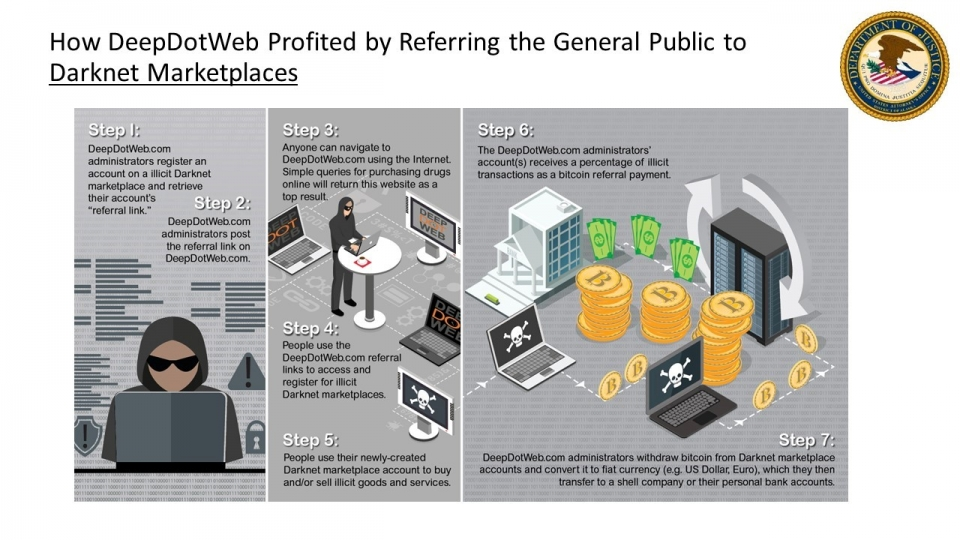
An infographic of how DeepDotWeb conducted its affiliate marketing operation by referring users to darknet marketplaces according to the United States Department of Justice

DeepDotWeb was a news site dedicated to events in and surrounding the dark web featuring interviews and reviews about darknet markets, Tor hidden services, privacy, bitcoin, and related news. The website was seized on May 7, 2019, during an investigation into the owners' affiliate marketing model, in which they received money for posting links to certain darknet markets, and for which they were charged with conspiracy to commit money laundering. In March 2021 site administrator Tal Prihar pleaded guilty to his charge of conspiracy to commit money laundering.

== Coverage ==
Coverage has included darknet market drug busts, pedophile crowdfunding, the details of hacking of darknet markets, as well as the diversification of markets such as TheRealDeal selling software exploits. Site features included blacklisted markets, comparisons, and reviews.

In May 2015, McAfee covered a free ransomware-as-a-service called 'Tox' hosted somewhere on the dark web whose developers gave an interview to DeepDotWeb.

== Domain seizure ==
On May 7, 2019, the deepdotweb.com and its sister .onion domain were redirected to a Domain Seizure notice. The notice was presented by the FBI and prominently displayed the logos of EUROPOL and numerous affiliate law enforcement agencies, including the British National Crime Agency and the German Bundeskriminalamt. The Israeli police alleged that the owners of DeepDotWeb had been receiving Bitcoin in exchange for links to black market sites on the deep web.

== Criminal charges ==
In May 2019 site owners Tal Prihar and Michael Phan were indicted in United States court, each on one charge of conspiracy to commit money laundering. According to the United States Department of Justice, DeepDotWeb received about $8.4 million in kickbacks from purchases of fentanyl, firearms, hacking tools, and other contraband on Darknet marketplaces, and transferred this to personal wallets using shell companies. According to the Department of Justice, while DeepDotWeb was in operation a total of 23.6 percent of all orders completed on AlphaBay involved DeepDotWeb.

In March 2021 site administrator Tal Prihar pleaded guilty to his charge of conspiracy to commit money laundering.

In January 2022, site administrator Tal Prihar was sentenced to 97 months in prison for money laundering. He was ordered to forfeit more than $8.4 million.

== See also ==
- Dread, a dark web discussion forum
