= OpenBazaar =

Decentralized darknet marketplace

- Logo
- Original authors: Amir Taaki (DarkMarket), Brian Hoffman
- Developer: OpenBazaar Team
- Release: 4 April 2016; 10 years ago
- Final release: 2.4.10 (Desktop Client) / 30 December 2020; 5 years ago
- Written in: Go, JavaScript
- Operating system: Microsoft Windows, OS X, Linux
- Size: 130 MB
- Available in: English
- Type: Online marketplace
- License: MIT License
- Website: openbazaar.org
- Repository: github.com/OpenBazaar

OpenBazaar was an open source project developing a protocol for e-commerce transactions in a fully decentralized marketplace. It used cryptocurrencies as medium of exchange and was inspired by a hackathon project called DarkMarket.

== History ==
Amir Taaki and a group of programmers from Bitcoin startup Airbitz created a decentralized marketplace prototype, called "DarkMarket", in April 2014 at a Bitcoin Hackathon in Toronto. DarkMarket was developed as a proof of concept in response to the seizure of the darknet market Silk Road in October 2013. Taaki compared DarkMarket's improvements on Silk Road to BitTorrent's improvements on Napster.

After the hackathon, the original creators abandoned the prototype and it was later adopted and rebranded to OpenBazaar by a new team of developers. On 4 April 2016, OpenBazaar released their first version, which allowed users to buy and sell goods for Bitcoin. The company announced the closure of their servers on 15 January 2021.

== See also ==
- InterPlanetary File System
- Tor (anonymity network)
