= Black Market Reloaded =

Darknet market

- Website type: Darknet market
- Available in: English
- Website: r6rcmz6lga4i5vb4.onion (defunct)
- Commercial: download
- Current status: Offline

Black Market Reloaded was a .onion hidden Tor website which sold illegal drugs and other illegal goods such as stolen credit cards and firearms. Its popularity increased dramatically after the closure of Silk Road, its largest competitor. In late November 2013, the owner of Black Market Reloaded announced that the website would be taken offline due to an unmanageable influx of new customers following the collapse of Sheep Marketplace and Silk Road.
