= The Farmer's Market =

Former Dark Web market

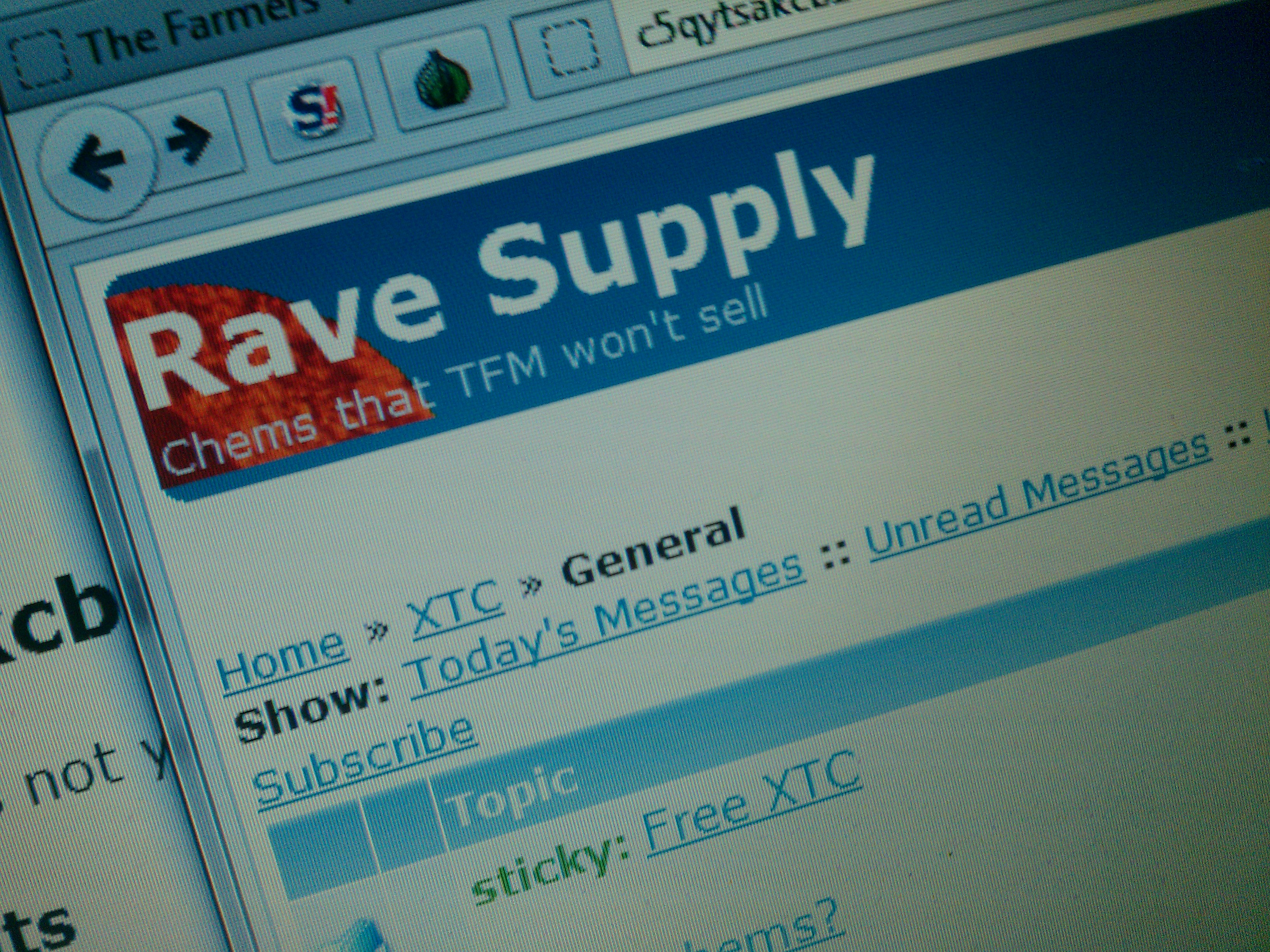
- Screenshot of a section of The Farmer's Market
- Website type: Darknet market
- Commercial: Yes
- Launched: c. 2006
- Current status: Inactive

The Farmer's Market [sic], formerly Adamflowers, was an online black market for illegal drugs. It was founded by Marc Peter Willems in or before 2006, and moved operations to the dark web in 2010 using the Tor anonymity network. It was closed and several operators and users arrested in April 2012 as a result of Operation Adam Bomb, a two-year investigation led by the U.S. Drug Enforcement Administration (DEA).

== Drug market ==
The online black marketplace was launched in or before 2006 by Marc Peter Willems as Adamflowers. The site connected buyers and sellers and mediated transactions of illicit substances through extensive use of Hushmail, an encrypted email service promoted as private and anonymous. It moved operations to a hidden site on the Tor network in 2010 and changed its name to The Farmer's Market. At the same time, it greatly expanded its services to offer not just a venue for transactions, but also customer service features more common to traditional eCommerce, such as guaranteed shipment and merchant screening. Ars Technica described it as "like an Amazon for consumers of controlled substances."

The Farmer's Market generated revenue through commissions based on the size of each purchase. The site allowed for several forms of payment including cash, PayPal, Western Union, Pecunix, and I-Golder. It managed all communications between buyers and sellers, and blurred the path between them by adding intermediaries known as "cash drops" who were paid a fee to receive payment from customers and forward it in another payment form to one of multiple bank accounts. The intermediaries and bank accounts were located in places like Panama or Budapest. According to DEA estimates, the site processed about $1 million between 2007 and 2009, and in 2011 the owners made $261,000 through PayPal alone. By 2012, about $2.5 million had been transferred through the site in total.

Among the drugs sold at the site were LSD, MDMA, mescaline, fentanyl, ketamine, DMT, hashish, psilocybin and marijuana, some of which carry substance-specific criminal penalties, depending on the country.

An estimated 3000 people in all 50 U.S. states and 45 other countries made transactions, many under age 21.

== Operation Adam Bomb ==
Over the course of two years the DEA conducted an investigation of The Farmer's Market in cooperation with local U.S. state and international authorities in the Netherlands, Colombia, and Scotland. The investigation used the codename Operation Adam Bomb, after the original name of the site, Adamflowers.

In March 2009, a DEA agent who gained access to the site successfully purchased 25 hits of LSD, sending money to Budapest and receiving the drugs in Los Angeles. He repeated the process with a larger order of 500 hits in September 2009. A 2012 indictment contained evidence in the form of hundreds of incriminating emails from 2006 to 2010. The undercover officer who had purchased LSD was party to several of the included emails. The indictment also indicated cooperation by the U.S. Postal Service and included as evidence that particular defendants had received envelopes at a post office box.

An email in the indictment described Hushmail, which the site used extensively, as "an encrypted and safe method of communication [which] would not produce e-mails to law enforcement officers." Though Hushmail's complicity with police was not made explicit in the indictment, Wired, Forbes, and the Tor blog suggested it would be likely given previous privacy concerns about the site.

The investigation culminated in the April 2012 arrest of fifteen people in the United States, Netherlands, and Colombia. Eight of the individuals were identified as connected to the site and seven individuals were left unnamed, likely site users. The law enforcement agency's 66-page, 12-count indictment named lead defendant Marc Peter Willems of the Netherlands and Michael Evron, an American citizen staying in Buenos Aires, as the two who functioned as "organizer, supervisor, and manager" of the site. Willems was extradited from the Netherlands after a two-year legal challenge to his extradition.

== Legal proceedings ==
Willems and Evron were charged with "participating in a continuing criminal enterprise," five of the eight arrested were charged with distributing LSD in particular, and all eight with money laundering and conspiracy to distribute controlled substances.

In September 2014, the 45-year-old Willems pleaded guilty to drug trafficking and money laundering. He confessed, in a Los Angeles Federal court, to making a profit from the trade of illegal drugs.

By the end of 2014, seven of the eight people indicted had entered guilty pleas. The eighth died before the trial began. In September 2014, Willems pleaded guilty to drug trafficking and money laundering charges, and was given a 10-year prison sentence that December.

== See also ==
- Anonymous email
- Silk Road (marketplace)
