= Exit scam =

Type of confidence trick

An exit scam or rug pull is a confidence trick or fraud, perpetrated under the guise of a legitimate business, that ends when the originator absconds with the funds contributed by participants. When a business entity pulls the rug and stops shipping orders while receiving payment for new orders, it could take some time before it is widely recognized that orders are not shipping. The entity can then make off with the money paid for unshipped orders. Customers who trusted the business do not realize that orders are not being fulfilled until the business has already disappeared. Exit scams are commonly associated with the rise of cryptocurrency projects due to the lack of regulation and decentralized ecosystem.

The best-known examples are online sellers where the buyer does not know the real identity or physical location of the scammer and therefore has little recourse. Payments to darknet markets are usually made in cryptocurrencies such as Bitcoin or Monero, where payments are irreversible and cannot be recovered through a chargeback.

Exit scams are frequently perpetrated on illegal darknet markets. While the most common such schemes are perpetrated by individual vendors who receive payment for the product they have no intention of shipping, such scams have also been perpetrated both by individual procurers who obtain the product which they have no intention of paying for, and by operators or administrators of these markets who, by shutting down an entire market, can abscond with whatever currency the market was holding on behalf of buyers and sellers in escrow at the time of the shutdown. Regardless of who is perpetrating the scam, if the cheated parties are themselves knowingly participating in illegal activities, it is not usually a viable option to notify law enforcement.

== By vendors ==
Individual vendors often reach a point of reputation maturity whereby they have sold sufficient product to have accumulated both significant reputation and escrowed funds, that many may choose to exit with those funds rather than compete at the higher-volume higher-priced matured product level. For individual vendors, exit scams are often a viable scheme when dealing with any physical product (for which buyers must reasonably expect to wait before receiving orders, thus often granting the perpetrator a considerable grace period before the scam can no longer be plausibly denied) compared to digital, virtual and other intangible goods which buyers will generally expect to be delivered within a very short time after remitting payment.

Exit scams could be a tempting alternative to a non-fraudulent shutdown of illegal operations if the operation was inevitably going to shut down anyway for other reasons. If an illegal entity thrives by selling and/or facilitating the sale of illicit drugs, for example, it is at constant risk of being shut down by the authorities, whereas if the operators perform an exit scam, there are much better prospects for the perpetrators to both keep their profits and avoid eventual prosecution.

== By purchasers ==
Purchasers can also perpetrate exit scams if, while secretly planning to close their business or abscond, they procure goods and services for which they do not intend to pay. However, these sorts of incidents are less common, due at least in part to the fact that purchasers are generally required to forward funds first before vendors process and ship purchasers their orders. Moreover, it is not uncommon for a procurer to go out of business due to insolvency they did not wish to occur. Such insolvencies are not typically considered to be criminal acts, let alone exit scams unless there is clear evidence of bad faith – e.g., if it can be proven the business avoided paying vendors even though it was solvent before closing down and/or it became insolvent as a result of embezzlement or other such behavior.

== Cryptocurrency scams ==
In 2016, the darknet market (online black market) Evolution was previously cited as the biggest exit scam yet, where the administrators apparently made off with $12 million in bitcoin, which was held in escrow on the marketplace.

Most exit scams and Ponzi schemes involving cryptocurrencies take place in the context of initial coin offerings. For example, a report by Satis Group estimates that 80% of all initial coin offerings that took place in 2017 were scams of this type.

This would ultimately be surpassed by the Wall Street Market exit scam of 2019, which had $14.2 million worth of cryptocurrencies stolen just before the site was seized by the authorities. Prosecution is difficult due to the anonymity offered by the darknet. The damage caused by exit scams is estimated to exceed $4.3 billion in 2019.
