= Clearnet (networking) =

Publicly accessible part of the Internet

Surface web in relation to deep web and dark web

Clearnet is a term that typically refers to the publicly accessible Internet. Sometimes clearnet is used as a synonym for surface web—excluding both darknets and the deep web. The World Wide Web is one of the most popular distributed services on the Internet, and the surface web is composed of the web pages and databases that are indexed by traditional search engines.

Clearnet can be seen as the opposite of darknet, which typically describes the services built on Tor or other anonymity networks, the connection to which is encrypted and anonymized. Because the darknet is not publicly accessible, it is part of the deep web. The term deep web describes those parts of the Internet that are not indexed, whether or not they are publicly accessible. It includes web portals to databases that require text searches, and interactive web sites that require more user input than simply clicking hyperlinks.

== Characteristics ==
Without the use of anonymity services like Tor, browsing the clearnet is typically not anonymous; most websites routinely identify users by their IP addresses as well as other data transmitted by the client.
