= WAHM (magazine) =

Web magazine

- Categories: Online community
- Founder: Cheryl Demas
- First issue: 1994; 31 years ago
- Based in: El Segundo, California
- Website: www.wahm.com

WAHM is an online magazine about work at home jobs, opportunities, and lifestyle. The name is an acronym for "Work at Home Moms," though the magazine covers issues affecting all home business workers and remote workers, both male and female.

== History ==
Software engineer Cheryl Demas founded WAHM in 1994 while herself a work at home mother. The site was initially targeted at stay-at-home mothers who had started home-based side businesses.

As remote work grew in popularity in corporate America, and later, as corporations tapped home-based workers as part of outsourcing efforts, WAHM's focus widened to include home-based workers of all types. This includes people with small home side businesses and remote workers working from home for companies of all sizes.

WAHM was acquired by Internet Brands in 2008.

== Site Functionality ==
WAHM features a magazine-style layout with a large library of articles related to the work-at-home lifestyle. The site also features home-based job listings and a discussion forum .

A large portion of the content on WAHM is focused on scams such as work-at-home schemes, and how to avoid them. WAHM's discussion forum is one of the places of the internet where readers can report work-at-home scams and read about them. Founder Cheryl Demas sometimes goes undercover and then she reports the scams that she has discovered in this way.

== Recognitions and awards ==
- Examiner.com named WAHM one of the "ten best websites for parents" in 2008.
