= Seleznyov =

Seleznyov, often spelled as Seleznev, Selezniev (Russian: Селезнёв, rarely Селезнев), or Seleznyova, Selezneva (feminine; Селезнёва), is a Russian surname, derived from the word "селезень" (drake, duck). Notable people with the surname include:

- Aleksandr Seleznyov (b. 1964), a retired Russian hammer thrower
- Alexey Selezniev
- Anna Selezneva
- Gennadiy Seleznyov (1947–2015), a Russian politician
- Kirill Seleznyov (disambiguation), several people
- Larisa Selezneva (b. 1963), a former Soviet pairs figure skater
- Natalya Seleznyova (b. 1945), a Soviet/Russian actress
- Oleg Seleznyov (1959–2021), Russian politician
- Olga Seleznyova
- Pyotr Seleznyov (1920–1985), a Soviet aircraft pilot and Hero of the Soviet Union
- Roman Seleznev (b. 1984), a Russian hacker, son of Valery Seleznev
- Serhiy Seleznyov (b. 1975), a Ukrainian footballer
- Svetlana Selezneva
- Vladimir Seleznyov (1928–1991), a Soviet army officer and a full cavalier of the Order of Glory
- Valery Seleznev (1964), a Russian politician
- Yevhen Seleznyov (b. 1985), a Ukrainian footballer
- Yuriy Seleznyov (b. 1975), a Ukrainian footballer
- Ekaterina Selezneva (b. 1995), a Russian rhythmic gymnast

== Fictional characters ==
- Alisa Seleznyova, a character from the series of children's science fiction books by Russian writer Kir Bulychov
