= NCFTA =

NCFTA may refer to:

- National Center for Traditional Arts, an art center in Taiwan
- National Cyber-Forensics and Training Alliance, a corporation in the United States
