= Worldwide brands =

Online wholesale directory

Worldwide Brands, Inc.
- Type: e-commerce
- Industry: Internet
- Founded: 1999
- Founder: Chris Malta
- Headquarters: Maitland, Florida, US,
- Area served: Worldwide
- Products: Directory of Certified Wholesalers
- Number of employees: 20+ (2008)
- Website: WorldwideBrands.com

Worldwide Brands is a Maitland, Florida based company that was founded by Chris Malta in 1999; it was registered as a corporation in 2001. It is a product sourcing research company that operates WorldwideBrands.com, a website whose primary function is to locate and qualify factory-authorized wholesale suppliers and wholesale manufacturers that are willing to sell to home businesses and Internet retailers. Worldwide Brands publishes the results of its findings in an online wholesale directory. The company's target market consists of small to medium-sized retailers, home businesses, and online merchants who sell on popular ecommerce platforms like eBay and Amazon, as well as on independent ecommerce websites.

== History and origin ==
The company was founded in 1999 by Chris Malta, CEO, and started as The Drop Ship Source Directory. In the early nineties, when running an online store became available, Chris found it hard to locate genuine wholesale suppliers that would work with online retailers and dropship to his end customers. He kept running into scams and fake suppliers. So after doing all the legwork himself, he built a small list of his own legitimate drop shipping suppliers. After writing an article about the challenges he was facing as an online entrepreneur, he was immediately approached by other retailers that wanted to buy his list. The Drop Ship Source Directory was born.

The Drop Ship Source Directory is no longer called that. In 2007, the Directory underwent a major user interface change, and was at that time called OneSource, as they expanded their offerings to include light bulk wholesalers, large volume wholesalers and liquidation suppliers that weren't previously offered in the Drop Ship Source Directory. Worldwide Brands ceased calling their Directory by the name "OneSource", and underwent another interface change in 2015.

Worldwide Brands Inc also coined the Term "Light Bulk Wholesale" in 2005, which means wholesale orders of $500.00 or less to make minimum orders affordable for small online retailers. Worldwide Brands continues to this day, convincing large volume wholesale suppliers to lower their minimums for small business buy-ins.

== Products ==
As of November 2016, Worldwide Brands Inc offers one product:

WBI Certified Directory of Dropshippers and Wholesalers

== See also ==
Business-to-Business
