= Arkady Bukh =

American lawyer (born 1972)

- Born: Arkady Lvovich Bukh; July 25, 1972 (age 54); Baku, Azerbaijan SSR, USSR
- Education: New York Law School
- Occupation: Attorney
- Known for: Azamat Tazhayakov (Boston Marathon bombing)

Arkady L. Bukh (Russian: Аркадий Львович Бух; born July 25, 1972) is an American criminal defense attorney. He is best known for representing Azamat Tazhayakov, a college student charged with conspiring to obstruct justice and obstructing justice with the intent to impede a terrorism investigation in the aftermath of the Boston Marathon bombing.

== Boston Marathon bombing ==
Bukh represented Azamat Tazhayakov. He was convicted in April 2014. The 19-year-old from Kazakhstan attended the University of Massachusetts-Dartmouth with Dzhokhar Tsarnaev, the accused bomber of the Boston Marathon bombing. Tazhayakov was arrested and indicted for charges associated with evidence tampering.

== Cyber crime ==
Bukh has also represented international hackers, like Alexander Vinnik, Igor Klopov, Oleg Nikolaenko, Dmitry Naskovets, Vlad Horohorin, Vladimir Tsastsin, Aleksandr Panin, Maksym Shynkarenko, and others.

=== Vladimir Tsastsin ===
Vladimir Tsastsin led an Estonian group that was able to place banners on the websites of unsuspecting webmasters, which resulted in payment for any clicks going not to the site owner but to the fraudsters. Additionally, Tsastsin was able to manipulate queries and ads and resell them. Despite being acquitted of all charges in Estonian court in December, 2013, Tsastsin was extradited to the U.S. in October, 2014. He faces multiple counts of fraud and money laundering in the Southern District of New York.

=== Aleksandr Panin ===
Russian citizen Aleksandr Panin created the SpyEye Trojan. Panin was arrested in 2013. Trapped in an FBI sting, Panin was extradited to the U.S. on charges of distributing SpyEye between 2009 and 2011.

Russian authorities called the actions by U.S. authorities completely “unacceptable.”

=== Igor Klopov ===
Igor Klopov targeted Forbes 400 individuals, including a close friend of former President George W. Bush. Klopov was charged by New York State in 2007 and sentenced to 3.5 to 10.5 years in prison.

Using the Forbes 400 list, Klopov was accused of stealing more than $1.5 million. Running the operation from his Moscow home, Klopov mined the internet for information about potential victims including Texas billionaire Charles J. Wyly Jr. a friend of then-President George W. Bush.

Four of Klopov's accomplices were subsequently arrested and pleaded guilty. Klopov's group targeted Texas and California, where property and deed information can be found online. Able to get information about property values and mortgage sizes, the group was able to focus on targets with generally large lines of credit.

=== Oleg Nikolaenko ===
Oleg Nikolaenko, dubbed “King of Spam” by the FBI. Nikolaenko was responsible for one-third of the world's spam before being arrested in 2009.

The FBI's break came in its investigation in August 2009, when Jody Smith of Missouri pleaded guilty to selling counterfeit Rolex watches. Using grand jury subpoenas, U.S. federal agents traced $459,000 in payments to Nikolaenko.

When Nikolaenko made a second trip to Las Vegas to attend the 2010 SEMA show, he was picked up by federal agents at the Bellagio Hotel and found to be carrying two passports and $4,000 in cash. Prosecutors say that world-wide spam dropped by 17 percent during the period Nikolaenko was detained.

Nikolaenko was sentenced to time served in 2013.

=== Vladislav Horohorin ===
Horohorin Vladislav was described by the US Secret Service as one of its five most wanted cyber criminals globally. Horohorin was one of the founders of CarderPlanet, an online board connecting cybercriminals around the world where they facilitated the trade. He was notorious for selling “dumps”, information encoded on the magnetic stripe of a credit card. Promoting his operations with video cartoons ridiculing American cardholders. Horohorin was arrested in France in 2010 and extradited to the U.S. in 2012. He was sentenced to 88 months in prison and $125,739 in restitution.

=== Maksym Shynkarenko ===
Shynkarenko, of Kharkiv, Ukraine is the most significant distributor of child pornography ever prosecuted in America according to American law enforcement authorities. Shynkarenko was indicted in 2008 by the Grand Jury for the New Jersey District and charged in 2012 with operating a network of websites. Pleading guilty to operating a child-exploitation enterprise in connection with the website which he ran from 2005 until 2008, Shynkarenko's website led to convictions in 47 states. Over 600 U.S.-based customers, including 30 men from New Jersey have been convicted in connection with the investigation into Shynkarenko's website.

Shynkarenko was arrested in 2009 while on vacation in Thailand and held for extradition to America. Shynkarenko fought extradition for three years and finally appeared in federal court.

In January, 2014, he pleaded guilty to all charges. He was sentenced to 30 years.

=== Michail Sorodsky ===
Sorodsky, 63, was sentenced to six years after he admitted to raping a sedated patient and sexually molesting seven others. Sorodsky portrayed himself as a “holistic healer” who would treat female patients who had been diagnosed with cancer. Using a probiotic yogurt, he would fondle the women and claim it was “treatment.”

Pretending to be a doctor in the Sheepshead community, Sorodsky would charge women up to $1,000 a visit. When Rimma Klots’ mother went for a “treatment” from Sorodsky, her daughter Rimma thought the method of treatment was a little different and decided to set up a sting-operation.

Posing as a patient, she visited Sorodsky. The younger Klots went to the licensing board when the treatment she received from Sorodsky consisted of getting a pelvic and breast exam.

When Sorodsky is released, he will have to register as a sex offender, be subject to 10 years of supervised parole and wear personal monitoring equipment.

== Other notable cases ==
=== Lakhinder Vohra ===
Lakhinder Vohra, was accused of raping a woman he met online. Vohra, stocky and bearded, had often posted images on his website and Facebook page showing him partying and socializing. The criminal case against Vohra was dropped in August, 2013. Vohra was accused of attacking his date inside his apartment. The two had met through the dating site before agreeing to meet at Vohra's home at 37 Wall Street.

=== Victor Koltun ===
Victor Koltun, a Brooklyn rabbi, was charged with a double murder-for-hire plot that left two Newburgh men dead. Koltun paid to have former police officer Francis Piscopo and his nephew Gerald killed to avoid paying a debt. Following 3 and a half years of delays, the jury convicted Koltun for the murders he orchestrated in an effort to avoid paying a debt. Koltun was eventually sentenced to two consecutive sentences of life in prison with no chance for parole.

The shooter in the murders, Frank Lewis pleaded guilty in 2011 and is serving 12.5 to 25 years in prison.
