= Work from Home (disambiguation) =

Work from home, or remote work, is a work arrangement in which employees do not commute to a central place of work.

Work from Home may also refer to:

- Work-at-home scheme, form of fraudulent scheme
- "Work from Home" (song), a 2016 song by Fifth Harmony featuring Ty Dolla Sign
- "Work from Home", a 2015 song by Jordin Sparks from Right Here Right Now
