= Work at home parent =

Remote worker who integrates parenting into their working time

A work at home parent (WAHP) is someone who conducts remote work from home and integrates parenting into their working time and workspace. They are sometimes referred to as a WAHM (work at home mom) or a WAHD (work at home dad).

People work from home for a variety of reasons, including lower business expenses, personal health limitations, eliminating commuting, or to have a more flexible schedule.This flexibility can give workers more options when planning tasks, business and non-business, including parenting duties. While some remote workers opt for childcare outside the home, others integrate child bearing into their working time and workspace. The latter are considered work-at-home parents.

Many WAHPs start home businesses to care for their children while still creating income. The desire to care for one's own children, the incompatibility of a 9-to-5 work day with school hours or sick days, and the expense of childcare prompt many parents to change or leave their jobs in the workforce to be available to their children. Many WAHPs build a business schedule that can be integrated with their parenting duties.

== Integrating business and parenting ==
An integration of parenting and business can take place in one or more of four key ways: combined uses of time, combined uses of space, normalizing children in business, and flexibility.

Combining uses of time involves some level of human multitasking, such as taking children on business errands, and the organized scheduling of business activities during child's down times and vice versa. The WAHP combines uses of space by creating a home (or mobile) office that accommodates the child's presence.

Normalizing acknowledges the child's presence in the business environment. This can include letting key business partners know that parenting is a priority, establishing routines and rules for children in the office, and even having children help with business when appropriate.

Finally, the WAHP can utilize the inherent flexibility of the work-at-home arrangement. This may mean working in smaller increments of time instead of long stretches, looser scheduling of the day's activities to allow for the unexpected, and working at non-traditional times.

A business that demands 9-to-5 business hours, a polished office, intense one-on-one time with clients, dangerous materials, or impromptu appointments may not work well for a parent with children at home. Thus, not all professions lend themselves to work-at-home parenting. Without good organization, the WAHP may experience decreased productivity due to added responsibilities and unexpected interruptions. Internet businesses or 'virtual assistants' are well-suited as work-at-home businesses.

The Center for Women's Business Research, a non-profit organization, found that Generation X mothers are the most likely to work from home. The center also reports that between 1997 and 2004, employment at female-owned companies grew by 24.2%, more than twice the rate of the 11.6% logged by all businesses.

Types of work that WAHPs may engage in include remote work, freelancing on project such as articles, graphic design or consulting, or working as an independent contractor, running home-party businesses, managing companies from home, and providing business and marketing support.

== History ==
The concept of the WAHP has been around for as long as small businesses have. In pre-industrial societies, merchants and artisans often worked out of or close to their homes. Children typically remained in the care of a parent during the day and were often present while the parents worked. Societal changes in the 1800s, such as compulsory education and the Industrial Revolution, made working from home with children around less common.

Entrepreneurship saw a resurgence in the 1980s, with more of an emphasis on work-life balance. Among the long-traditional groups of WAHPs are those professionals in private practice with home offices such as physicians, therapists, music teachers and tutors. The term WAHP began gaining popularity in the late 1990s especially as the growth of the Internet allowed for small business owners and entrepreneurs to have greater options for starting and running their businesses. Remote work opportunities have since increased with advances in technology.

In 2008, WAHM Magazine, a digital magazine, was established specifically for work-at-home parents, designed to address the issues of the complete lifestyle of work-at-home parents regardless of field or industry, and has a mission to validate, empower, encourage, educate and support WAHPs in their personal, professional and lifestyle goals.

During the COVID-19 lockdowns, many parents have to juggle paid employment and full-time daycare, which is likely to limit their productivity and the anticipated benefits of working from home. However, changes in technology and firm culture have increased the likelihood of working from home arrangements being made available to parents, particularly mothers.

== See also ==
- Homeschooling
- Attachment parenting
- Home Business
- Superwoman (sociology)
- Work-at-home scheme
