= ShadowCrew =

Cybercrime forum (2002–2004)

- Website type: Forum
- Creator: Corrie
- Commercial: Yes
- Registration: Required to access features

ShadowCrew was a cybercrime forum that operated under the domain name ShadowCrew.com between August 2002 and November 2004.

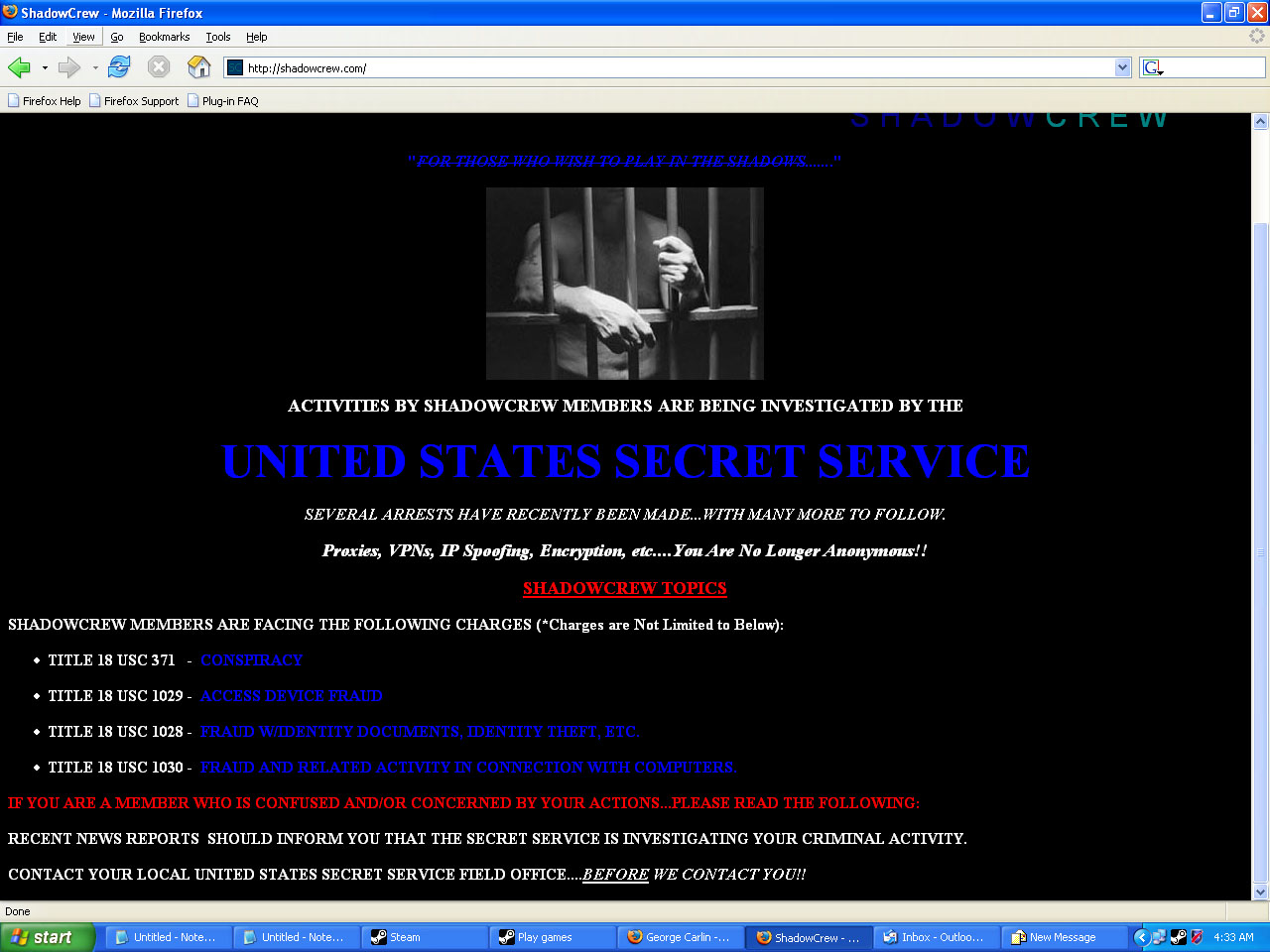
This screenshot was taken 11/02/2004 at 4:33AM immediately after ShadowCrew forum was infiltrated by the Secret service.

This screenshot was taken 11/02/2004 at 4:33AM immediately after ShadowCrew forum was infiltrated by the Secret service.

== Origins ==
The idea of the ShadowCrew was developed in early 2002 during a series of chat sessions between Brett Johnson (GOllumfun), Seth Sanders (Kidd), and Kim Marvin Taylor (MacGayver). The ShadowCrew website also contained a number of sub-forums on the latest information on hacking tricks, social engineering, credit card fraud, virus development, scams, and phishing.

== Organizational structure ==
ShadowCrew emerged early in 2002 from another underground site, counterfeitlibrary.com, which was run by Brett Johnson and would be followed up by carderplanet.com owned by Dmitry Golubov a.k.a. Script, a website primarily in the Russian language. The site also facilitated the sale of drugs wholesale.

During its early years, the site was hosted in Hong Kong, but shortly before CumbaJohnny (Albert Gonzalez)'s arrest, the server was in his possession somewhere in New Jersey.

== Aftermath and legacy ==
ShadowCrew was the forerunner of today's cybercrime forums and marketplaces. The structure, marketplace, review system, and other innovations began when Shadowcrew laid the basis of today's underground forums and marketplaces. Likewise, many of today's current scams and computer crimes began with Counterfeitlibrary and Shadowcrew. The site flourished from the time it opened in 2002 until its demise in late October 2004. Even though the site was booming with criminal activity and all seemed well, the members did not know what was going on behind the scenes. Federal agents received their "big break" when they found CumbaJohnny aka Albert Gonzalez. Upon Cumba's arrest, he immediately turned and started working with federal agents. From April 2003 to October 2004, Cumba assisted in gathering information and monitoring the site and those who utilized it. He started by taking out many of the Russians who were hacking databases and selling counterfeit credit cards. CumbaJohnny was a long term police informant who was responsible for teaching the US Secret Service how to monitor, trap and arrest the ShadowCrew.

The Federal indictment says, "Shadowcrew was an international organization of approximately 4,000 members…" The last available page before October 27, 2004 on archive.org shows 2,709 registered members. To people familiar with the ShadowCrew forum, it is well known that many members had multiple user names. Members who were banned from the forum would frequently register with another user name as well. Lastly, the forum was around for over 2 years so there were possibly many inactive accounts. However, there was also a need by members to develop a name that could be trusted; so it is possible that the idea that most of the registered users were duplicates isn't accurate.

$4 million in losses is the believed amount dealt with through this forum. This figure was arrived at by multiplying the number of credit cards transferred by $500 each (as per federal law when no monetary figure in a fraud case can be determined). This figure assumes that every single card was valid and had been used. The dollar figure quoted only pertains to the evidence gathered by the VPN employed and the members. The actual dollar figure is potentially much higher due to the fact that the $500 per card federal law wasn't in existence until after federal agents took down the site.

ShadowCrew admin Brett Johnson managed to avoid being arrested following the 2004 raids, but was picked up in 2005 on separate charges, in which he then turned informant for the Secret Service. Continuing to commit tax fraud as an informant, 'Operation Anglerphish' embedded him, then dubbed by Secret Service agents as "The Original Internet Godfather", as admins on both ScandinavianCarding and CardersMarket. When his continued carding activities were exposed as a part of a separate investigation in 2006, he briefly went on the run and made the United States Most Wanted List before being caught in August of that year.

In 2011, former Bulgarian ShadowCrew member Aleksi Kolarov a.k.a. APK was finally arrested and held in Paraguay before being extradited to the United States in 2013 to face charges.

In 2019 CNN released an episode of Declassified: Untold Stories of American Spies detailing the Secret Service investigation into ShadowCrew.

In 2022 the Podcast Darknet Diaries made a two-part interview with GOllumfun and talked about insides from ShadowCrew.

== See also ==
- Computer crime
- Hacking
- Internet forums
- Organized crime
- Russian Mafia
