= Sergey Pavlovich =

- Born: February 22, 1983 (age 43); Belarus
- Other names: Police Dog, panther[757], Fallen Angel, diplomaticos
- Occupation: carder
- Penalty: 10 years federal prison

Sergey Alexandrovich Pavlovich (also known as Police Dog, panther[757], Fallen Angel, diplomaticos) is one of the most famous carders on the territory of the former Soviet Union.

== Biography ==
Born 22 February 1983 in Vyazye, a village in Mogilev region of Belarus. In 2000 finished School No 124 in Minsk. In 2000–2003 was studying on the faculty of Journalism of Belarusian State University. In 2004–2009 was brought to trial three times on account of cyber crimes. The total sentence amounted to 16 years in jail. While being in jail, Sergey wrote and published a book:

How to Steal A Million: The Memoirs of a Russian Hacker

in which he convinced young men not to follow in his criminal steps. All of the honorarium for the book the author donated to a Children's Oncologic Clinic of Borovlyany (Belarus).

== Criminal activities ==
Sergey started his criminal career with contributing to Russia's largest carding forum CarderPlanet.

Among Sergey's friends and e.f.g. partners in crime were such people as BadB (Vladislav Khorokhorin), Fidel (Sergey Storchak), Maksik (Maksim Yastremskiy), JonnyHell (Alexander Suvorov) and a Chinese Triad boss Michael Cheung Ho and others.

In 2008 Sergey appeared among the 11 people charged with "the largest personal data theft in the history of the USA". An associate of the famous hacker Albert Gonzalez.

Currently he is an entrepreneur (4 businesses on the Internet), the author of the popular YouTube channels "People PRO" and "Mother Russia", acts as a speaker on cybersecurity and promotion on YouTube.
