= CardSystems Solutions =

Credit card processing company

CardSystems Solutions was a credit card processing company. In June 2005, the fact that 40 million credit cards had been stolen from CardSystems was discovered. This led to the discoveries that CardSystems had been keeping data in unencrypted form that it was contractually obligated to delete, and that its own network was vulnerable to infiltration by hackers. Visa and American Express subsequently dropped it as a credit card processing company. The data breach prompted controversy over regulation and triggered a federal investigation into the incident. CardSystems was acquired by Pay By Touch. The buyout was completed on December 9, 2005. All charges brought by the Federal Trade Commission against the company were settled in February 2006. On March 19, 2008, Pay By Touch shut down.

At the time it was the largest computer hack in history. The hack would be surpassed by two different Albert Gonzalez hacks discovered in 2007 – the 45.6 million cards hacked from TJX Companies, revealed in March, and the 130 million cards hacked from Heartland Payment Systems, revealed in July.
