= Plastic card =

Card made of PVC or other plastic conforming

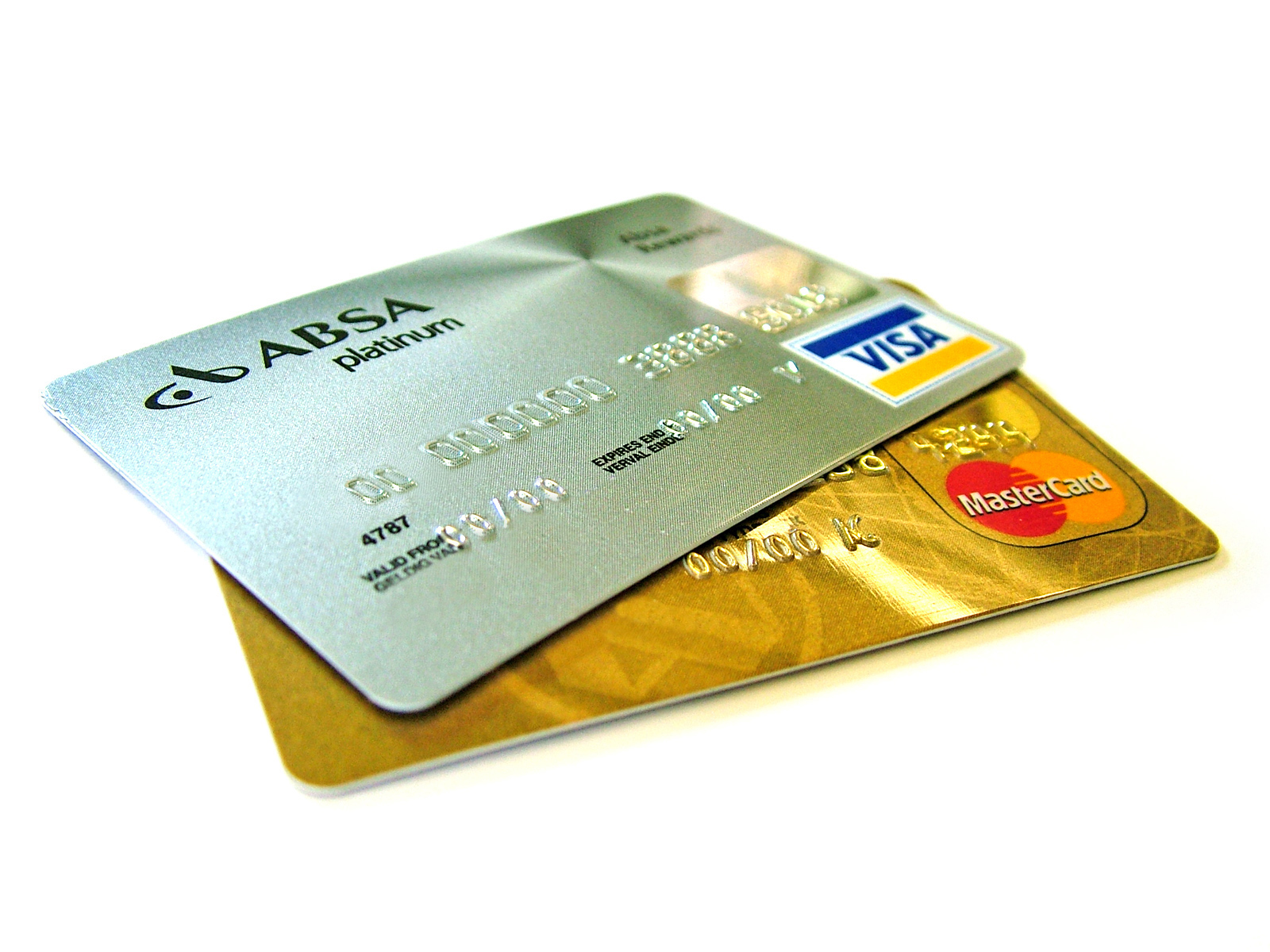
Plastic credit cards

Plastic cards usually serve as identity documents, thus providing authentication. In combination with other assets that complement the data stored on the card, like PINs, they also serve authorization purposes, most often as debit or credit cards for allowing their holders to make financial transactions. Early and simpler cards feature only hard-to-imitate integrated photographs, security holograms, guillochés, or a magnetic strip on which few bytes of personal data could be stored. Today, smart cards, i.e. those equipped with an electronic chip (storage, or RFID), serve as high-security active electronic documents that allow their holder to qualify for driving cars (drivers license card), receive medical treatment (health insurance cards), do banking and more.

== Industry ==
In their January 2020 report, the International Card Manufacturers Association's (ICMA) indicates a production increase to a record-high of 37.1 billion cards and $27 billion revenue in 2019. Forecasts predicted market growth at a rate of 8.2% from 2021 to 2028, which was counteracted by losses through the COVID-19 pandemic.

== Production ==
Plastic cards (standard size ID-1) come in various colors and finishing. The laminated mixture of various dyes, paper and plastics (so far mainly PVC and PVCA) and the integration with electronics makes them hard to recycle.

== Classification ==
=== Type ===
==== Range ====
- Contact cards (must be inserted into a suitable reading device, e.g. magnetic stripe cards)
- Contactless cards (using Near-field communication or RFID)

=== Techno ===
Apart from "regular", i.e. non-electronic cards, there is considerable overlap between "chip-enabled", "digital" and "smart" cards, mostly for historical reasons in the development of the current fully equipped smart cards.

- Regular cards
- Chip-enabled cards
- Smart cards
- Digital card
- Magnetic stripe cards

=== Applications ===
- Gift cards
- Discount cards
- Access cards
- Payment cards
  - Credit cards
  - Debit cards
- Telephone cards
- Transportation cards
- Government/Health, e.g.
  - European Health Insurance Card,
  - Identity card,
  - Passport card
- SIM cards (smaller size contact card only used within mobile phones)

== Non-electronic security features ==
Plastic cards may be printed with the following security-relevant features, some of them also containing personal information, others only serving as anti-forgery devices:

- QR code and / or barcode
- photograph
- signature
- security hologram
- microprinting
- guilloché patterns (similar to bank notes)

== See also ==
- Electronic banking
- Plastic recycling
- Plastic compounding
