= Contactless =

Contactless may refer to:

- Contactless smart card
- Proximity card, a contactless integrated circuit device used for security access or payment systems
- Contactless payment, systems which use RFID for making secure payments
- MasterCard Contactless, MasterCard's EMV-compatible contactless payment feature
- Radio-frequency identification, an automatic identification method
- Near Field Communication, a short-range wireless technology
- Contactless fingerprinting is a step beyond wet-ink, but not necessarily "touchless" and refers to processes for data collection, verification and identification
