= Carder.su =

Crime forum and online marketplace

- Website type: Crime forum, Online marketplace
- Available in: English, Russian
- Revenue: Credit card fraud, identity theft, data sales
- Website: (site inactive)
- Commercial: Yes
- Registration: Required
- Launched: c. 2006–2007
- Current status: Offline / Defunct
- Content license: Illicit

Carder.su was a crime forum and online marketplace specialising in the sale of credit card details and identity theft. It was shut down by US law enforcement in 2010.

Since 2007, Operation Open Market, an operation run by the HSI and the United States Secret Service targeted the site, believed to be based in Las Vegas in the US.

In 2011, an alleged major vendor of credit card dumps and prominent Carder.su member, Roman Seleznev, was apprehended in the Maldives by US law enforcement.

In 2012, identity thief David Ray Camez was arrested and charged with everyone else in an unprecedented use of the RICO legislation.

In early 2012, American cash-out master and top level carder Cameron "Kilobit" Harrison and 38 other people were indicted under the R.I.C.O. statute and arrested for buying and selling hacked and or otherwise compromised card details via Carder.su. In November 2014, Kilobit (Cameron Harrison) was sentenced to 115 months in Federal Prison and ordered to pay $50.8 million in restitution after rejecting and refusing any plea deals that were offered by the government. His release date is set as 02/19/2021.

In January 2015 a Macedonian man Jordan Georgievski was arrested in relation to the site.

In March 2015 the US Department of State issued a reward for information leading to the arrest of mid-level leader Konstantin Lopatin, a.k.a. "Graf" and leader Roman Olegovich Zolotarev. These rewards remain unclaimed and total $3 million.
