= Roman Seleznev =

Russian computer hacker

- Роман Селезнёв
- Born: July 23, 1984 (age 41); Vladivostok, Russian SFSR, Soviet Union
- Other names: nCuX, Track2, Bulba, Zagreb, shmak, smaus
- Citizenship: Russian
- Known for: Hacking
- Criminal charges: Hacking, wire fraud, racketeering
- Criminal status: Repatriated to Russia as part of prisoner exchange
- Father: Valery Seleznev

Roman Valerevich Seleznev (Note: Because Seleznev was a politician's child his name had to be redacted on Department of Justice documents when Operation Open Market had occurred initially.) (or Seleznyov, Russian: Роман Валерьевич Селезнёв; born July 23, 1984), also known by his hacker name Track2, is a Russian computer hacker. Seleznev was indicted in the United States in 2011, and was convicted of hacking into servers to steal credit-card data. His activities are estimated to have caused more than US$169 million in damages to businesses and financial institutions. Seleznev was arrested on July 5, 2014, while vacationing in the Maldives, and was sentenced to 27 years in prison for wire fraud, intentional damage to a protected computer, and identity theft. Seleznev would only serve ten years in prison before he would take part in the 2024 Ankara prisoner exchange that involved 26 total people, including himself.

== Early life ==
Seleznev is the son of Valery Seleznev, a member of Russia's Duma.

== Hacking career ==
He began his activities in early 2003 on the credit card fraud site CarderPlanet, providing paid Social Security numbers and criminal-history research using (among others) stolen LexisNexis accurint.com accounts. Seleznev's employee later created a scanner which allowed a user to scan the internet for MSRDP open ports (3389 by default). Default configurations provided poor protection at the time, and many administrator accounts were not secured by passwords. Exploiting this vulnerability, Seleznev and his partner accessed many remote computers, including those with financial and credit-card data.

He contacted BadB, another hacker, to gain more experience in exploiting financial systems. BadB, a cybercriminal identified in 2009 as Vladislav Horohorin, provided Seleznev with an automated script to look for credit card traces in systems and networks. With this script, Seleznev obtained his first credit-card dumps, which he resold to Horohorin. He became dissatisfied with Horohorin, and decided to begin his own credit-card-dump operation using the nickname nCuX (from Russian: псих, "psycho").

Seleznev expanded his operations in 2008 from scanning MSRDP with default (or no) passwords to developing sophisticated malware which could intercept network traffic and search network shares, distributing it through flaws in web browsers by injecting malicious code into advertising traffic. He infected many computers, primarily in the United States.

By May 2009, USSS believed they had collected enough information to come to the conclusion that nCuX was probably the identity of Roman Seleznev. They had a meeting with the Russian intelligence agency FSB in which they shared information from their investigation and their belief that nCuX was Seleznev. Shortly after this meeting, in June 2009, nCuX closed all of his accounts and disappeared from the Internet; USSS suspected FSB had tipped Seleznev off.

After shutting down nCuX, Seleznev created two other names (Track2 and Bulba) and used them to operate his own automated stolen-credit-card shops. He bought advertising space in the "Dumps" section of the illegal carding forum carder.su, which was shut down in a 2012 Department of Homeland Security operation. Horohorin's advertising campaign on carder.su was also shut down, and a denial-of-service attack ensued. He was arrested by USSS in August 2010, leaving Seleznev without competition.

During a vacation in Morocco, Seleznev received a severe head injury in the 2011 Marrakesh bombing and was evacuated to Moscow for surgery.

== Arrest and trial ==
Seleznev's 2014 arrest was controversial in Russia. Russian officials called his arrest a "kidnapping", and said that the U.S. had failed to notify Russian consulates. The DOJ initially refused to disclose the location of Seleznev's arrest, but prosecutors later revealed he was arrested while on vacation at Kanifushi Resort in the Maldives. The Russian Foreign Ministry criticized the island country for failing to follow "international legal norms", which prosecutors said was justified based on the noncooperation of the FSB in 2009 and the scope of Seleznev's crimes. As the Maldives does not have an extradition treaty with the United States, the USSS negotiated directly with the Maldivian government to arrange an expulsion of Seleznev into U.S. law enforcement custody, from which he was sent to Guam to await trial.

DHS Secretary Jeh Johnson said in a statement the arrest showed that "despite the increasingly borderless nature of transitional organized crime, the long arm of justice – and the Department of Homeland Security – will continue to disrupt and dismantle sophisticated criminal organizations".

In 2016, after a 1½-week trial in the U.S. District Court for the Western District of Washington, a jury found Seleznev guilty on 38 counts; the following year, he was sentenced to 27 years' imprisonment. On May 19, 2017, Seleznev faced charges in Atlanta and Nevada; he pled guilty that September to conspiracy to commit bank fraud, and was sentenced to 14 years in prison in November. This sentence will run concurrently with his original sentence.

Later reporting indicated that Seleznev's arrest may have been the result of a cooperative effort between the U.S. government and an officer working within the FSB.

Seleznev was held at the medium security prison FCI Butner in North Carolina, after being transferred from USP Atlanta in 2018. He requested to be transferred to FCI Butner due to the prison's good living conditions and hospital.

Family members of Paul Whelan, who was arrested in 2018 for espionage in Moscow, and sentenced to 16 years in prison, said that Whelan had initially been told that he had been arrested to be exchanged for a Russian prisoner in the United States, mentioning Konstantin Yaroshenko (who was later released in return for American Trevor Reed), Viktor Bout (who was later released in exchange for American women's basketball player Brittney Griner), or Roman Seleznev.

On August 1, 2024, Seleznev was released in a 26 person prisoner exchange that included Paul Whelan. Seleznev was personally met at the Moscow airport by Russian president Vladimir Putin.
