= Superwoman (sociology) =

Term used in sociology

In sociology, a superwoman (also sometimes called supermom) is a woman who works hard to manage multiple roles of a worker, a homemaker, a volunteer, a student, or other such time-intensive occupations. The notion of "superwoman" differs from that of "career woman" in that the latter one commonly includes sacrifice of the family life in favor of career, while a superwoman strives to excel in both.

A number of other terms are derived from "superwoman", such as superwoman syndrome, superwoman squeeze (a pressure on a superwoman to perform well in her multiple roles), and superwoman complex (an expectation of a superwoman that she can and should do everything). Marjorie Hansen Shaevitz entitled her book The Superwoman Syndrome in 1984.

== Post second-wave feminism ==
=== Origin of the term ===
The notion was first recognized in the post second-wave feminism American society of 1970s–1980s, with the shift of the woman's traditional role of a housewife towards a more career-oriented way of life. This life involved the pursuit of both traditional female roles in the home and with children, as well as the pursuit of traditionally masculine goals in the form of jobs and public social status.

=== Criticism ===
The term and its concept have been critiqued by people within the feminist movement. English feminist and historian Lucy Delap argues that the idea of the "superwoman" has been perceived as exclusionary by many feminist scholars. Moreover, Betty Friedan, an American feminist, in her book The Second Stage argued that "superwomanhood" of the 1980s has led to double enslavement of women, both at home and at work. Her advice for feminists was to step up to the "second stage" of the feminist movement and to struggle for reshaping both gender roles and redefining social values, styles, and institutional structures, for the fulfillment to be achievable in both public and private lives without the necessity to sacrifice one for another. This yearning for balance within a feminist framework was called a "shift from the Superwoman ideal to the Balanced Woman ideal" by American feminist Catherine Rottenberg.

As the role of the "superwoman" became less popular going into the 1990s, the continued model of the "superwoman" still used in advertisements also received criticism. One ad in particular featured a woman dressed in 1950s garb posed above text that reads, "It's not easy to pull together the perfect holiday."

The notion of the "superwoman" also faced backlash from critics of second-wave feminism primarily in the 1980s-1990s. According to American journalist and feminist Susan Faludi, these critics deemed "superwomanhood" a feminist goal that could not be achieved due to the juggling act the role required women to undertake. This reaffirmed, in the postfeminist era, the idea that was propositioned by anti-feminists before the second-wave: that women could not have a career, a family life, and be fulfilled all at once.

== Modern relevance ==
=== The United States ===
Despite the modern woman's increased role in the workforce within present western culture, domestic responsibilities and child care are still perceived primarily as female work. In today's cultural climate, evidence of this can be found through studies as well as in modern resources, such as online parenting guides and discussion sites.

=== Australia ===
A 2007 study done in Australia concluded that the everyday lives of both fathers and people without children were less strained than women who fell under the "superwoman" role.

== Popular media and texts ==
The term was also used in a somewhat similar context in the Stevie Wonder song "Superwoman", released 1972. It was the title of a 1975 book by Shirley Conran; she also wrote Superwoman 2 (1977); Superwoman in Action (1979); and Down with Superwoman: for everyone who hates housework (1990).

Modern examples of the superwoman are also pervasive in contemporary film and television shows.

== See also ==
- Work-life balance
- Workaholic
- Lean In: Women, Work, and the Will to Lead (2013) by Sheryl Sandberg
- Helicopter parent
- Maternalism
- Second shift
- Slow parenting
- Work at home parent
