= Tor Carding Forum =

Online black market and discussion forum

- Website type: Internet forum
- Available in: English
- Current status: Unknown as of 2026

The Tor Carding Forum (TCF) was a Tor-based forum specializing in the trade of stolen credit card details, identity theft and currency counterfeiting. The site was founded by an individual known as 'Verto' who also founded the now defunct Evolution darknet market.

The site required $50 for registration.

A 2013 investigation into counterfeit banknotes in Pittsburgh led to a source of Ugandan fakes being identified as having been purchased via the Tor Carding Forums. By December 2014 Ryan Andrew Gustafson a.k.a. "Jack Farrel" and "Willy Clock", a US citizen living in Uganda was arrested for large scale sale of counterfeit United States currency by the U.S. Secret Service which was being sold through the Tor Carding Forums as well as other crime forums.

In December 2014 the site closed following a hack, directing users to Evolution's forums.

In June 2015 a dark web researcher identified the clearnet IP address of a similar hidden service branded 'The Tor Carding Forum V2' which was subsequently shut down.
