= Work-at-home scheme =

Scams focused on businesses run from one's home

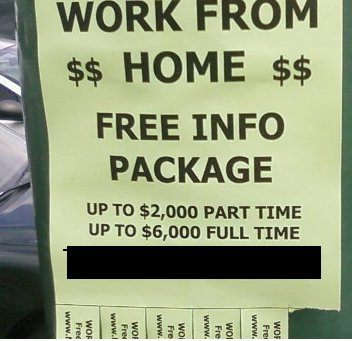
An ad for a work-at-home scheme posted on a pole

A work-at-home scheme is a get-rich-quick scam in which a victim is lured by an offer to be employed at home, very often doing some simple task in a minimal amount of time with a large amount of income that far exceeds the market rate for the type of work. The true purpose of such an offer is for the perpetrator to extort money from the victim, either by charging a fee to join the scheme, or requiring the victim to invest in products whose resale value is misrepresented.

== Overview ==
Remote work schemes have been recorded since the early 20th century; the earliest studied "envelope stuffing" scam originated in the United States during the Great Depression in the 1920s and 1930s. In this scam, the worker is offered entry to a scheme where they can earn $2 for every envelope they fill. After paying a small $2 fee to join the scheme, the victim is sent a flyer template for the self-same work-from-home scheme, and instructed to post these advertisements around their local area – the victim is simply "stuffing envelopes" with flyer templates that perpetuate the scheme. Originally found as printed adverts in newspapers and magazines, variants of this scam have expanded into more modern media, such as television and radio adverts, and forum posts on the Internet.

In some countries, law enforcement agencies work to fight work-at-home schemes. In 2006, the United States Federal Trade Commission (FTC) established Project False Hopes, a federal and state law enforcement sweep that targets bogus business opportunities and work-at-home scams. The crackdown involved more than 100 law enforcement actions by the FTC, the Department of Justice, the United States Postal Inspection Service, and law enforcement agencies in eleven states.

Home-based business and remote work are a legitimate avenue for employment, but anyone seeking such an employment opportunity can be scammed by accepting home employment offers from individuals or unknown companies. A 2007 report in the United States suggested that about 97% of work-at-home offers were scams. Many legitimate jobs at home require some form of post-high-school education, such as a college degree or certificate, or trade school, and some experience in the field in an office or other supervised setting. Additionally, many legitimate at-home jobs are not like those in schemes are portrayed to be, as they are often performed at least some of the time in the company's office, require more self discipline than a traditional job, and have a higher risk of firing.

Common types of work found in work-at-home schemes include:

- Stuffing envelopes. The victim sees a flyer advertising a job stuffing envelopes, with "up to 1,000 envelopes a week that you can stuff... with postage and address already affixed!", offering a payment of $1–2 per envelope. To apply for the job, the victim is required to send a self-addressed stamped envelope for information and a small processing fee. In return, the victim is sent a template for the flyer they had originally seen; the envelopes they stuff are from other people who answer the flyer, and the payment is the processing fee.
- Assembly of items of some type, such as crafts, jewellery or medical equipment. The worker is required to pay upfront for materials and construction kits, and when they attempt to sell the finished products back to the scheme's organizer they are told that the products "don't meet our specifications", leaving the worker with assembled products and no buyer.
- Processing medical claims. The worker pays several hundred dollars for medical billing software, but will later discover that most medical clinics process their own bills, outsource their billing to established firms rather than individuals, or have stricter requirements than the purchased software can provide.
- Forum spamming. Usually advertised as some variant of "email processing", the worker is simply given instructions on spamming online forums and told they can make money by selling these same instructions online.
- Money mule, where the victim is required to receive and cash the fraudulent check and send back part of the proceeds and keep the other part. This is money laundering and will get the victim in trouble with the bank as well as with the law, as the check bounces (where the victim is liable for the bounced check) and can and often does lead to prosecution.
- Re-shipping, where the victim is required to receive the merchandise (often high-priced merchandise such as iPhones, iPads, MacBooks, or Pixel smartphones) purchased with stolen credit cards (or picked up at carrier service centers or retail stores such as Best Buy), then ship them eventually overseas, usually to Eastern Europe. The package may be re-shipped to multiple U.S. addresses before leaving for the scammers. The victim is usually in it for about a month, after which their communications with the scammers cease. The victims are usually never paid and lose money, often as a result of paying for shipping supplies, and usually further victimized with identity theft but are generally not prosecuted unless a warning from law enforcement is ignored. This type of scam usually occurs during the winter holiday season.

During the COVID-19 pandemic, work-at-home schemes, as well as victims affected by such schemes, were extremely common.

Some advertisements offer legitimate forms of work that really do exist, but exaggerate the salary and understate the effort that will have to be put into the job, or exaggerate the amount of work that will be available. Many such ads do not even specify the type of work that will be performed. Some similar schemes do not advertise work that would be performed at home, but may instead offer occasional, sporadic work away from home for large payments, paired with a lot of free time. Some common offers fitting this description are acting as extras, mystery shopping (which in reality requires hard work, is paid close to minimum wage, and most importantly, does not require an up-front fee to join) and working as a nanny.

== Consequences ==
The consequences of falling for a work-at-home scheme may be as follows:

- Loss of money: It may be only the initial fee to join, which may be a large or small amount. Some scammers will cease contact with the victim after receiving just this fee. Others will continue to ask for more in order for the promise of high pay to be fulfilled. Some will actually issue paychecks, while receiving payments of greater value in return, which in some cases have exceeded tens of thousands of US dollars. In other cases, the employer may obtain the victim's personal information for purposes of identity theft.
- Loss of legitimate job: Those with a real job may quit in hopes of a better one, only to find they cannot get their original job back after they discover their dream job was only a hoax.
- Damaged reputation: Those who engage in sales of a faulty or otherwise controversial product may be tarnishing their own name as the salesperson of such a worthless item.
- Trouble with law: Some victims may actually receive money. But at the same time, they may be unknowingly breaking the law, on behalf of the perpetrator of the scheme, but will be fully legally responsible. Such violations may be criminal or civil in nature. In other cases, they will not be committing any criminal acts, but they will end up framed in an investigation for the crimes of the perpetrator.
- Wasted time: Victims will often invest huge amounts of time with no pay in return. This is time that can be spent earning money at a legitimate job.
- Victim's contact information is sold to other scammers, who then contact the victim with new scams.

== See also ==
- "The Adventure of the Stockbroker's Clerk"
