= David Schrooten =

Dutch computer hacker

David Benjamin Schrooten is a Dutch computer hacker also known as Fortezza and Xakep. In 2012, he was arrested in Romania at the request of the United States Secret Service and extradited to Seattle, Washington. Here he was sentenced to 12 years in federal prison, primarily for his role in trafficking credit cards he obtained by hacking other hackers. By doing so, he caused approximately 63 million dollars in damages.

In 2014 he was sent back to the Netherlands through a treaty transfer and subsequently released in December that same year. After his release he authored a book named Alias Fortezza chronicling his arrest and incarceration.

As a computer hacker he was particularly notorious for hacking rival groups such as the Infraud Organization, in which he crowned himself admin under the alias xakep. He was also known as one of the founders of the cybercrime forum kurupt. That later split up in two separate forums, because of infighting among founding members. The break up resulted in hacking skirmishes between the groups that ended when they started publishing each other names. After his arrest, the remaining forum kurupt.ru kept operating and continued getting themselves involved in high-profile hacking endeavours such as the stophaus attack, that broke a part of the internet.
