= Federal Correctional Institution, Victorville =

Medium-security prison in California, US

Coordinates: 34°34′03″N 117°21′52″W

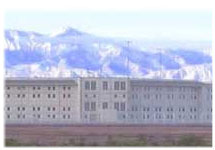
- Interactive map of Federal Correctional Institution, Victorville
- Location: Victorville, California
- Status: Operational
- Security class: Medium-security (with low-security female prison camp)
- Population: 1,300 (300 in prison camp)
- Opened: 2004
- Managed by: Federal Bureau of Prisons
- Warden: K. Ball, Acting Warden

The Federal Correctional Institution, Victorville (FCI Victorville Medium I & II) are two medium-security United States federal prisons in Victorville, California. Part of the Victorville Federal Prison Complex, it is operated by the Federal Bureau of Prisons, a division of the United States Department of Justice.

== Description ==
FCI Victorville Medium are two medium-security United States federal prisons for male inmates in Victorville, California. Part of the Victorville Federal Prison Complex, it is operated by the Federal Bureau of Prisons, a division of the United States Department of Justice. There is an adjacent satellite prison camp for low-security female inmates. The complex is located on land that was formerly part of George Air Force Base.

It was built on a Superfund site, which has contaminated the region's water supply with industrial solvents like trichlorethylene, and pesticides like dieldrin and aldrin, and chemicals from jet fuel.

== Notable incidents ==
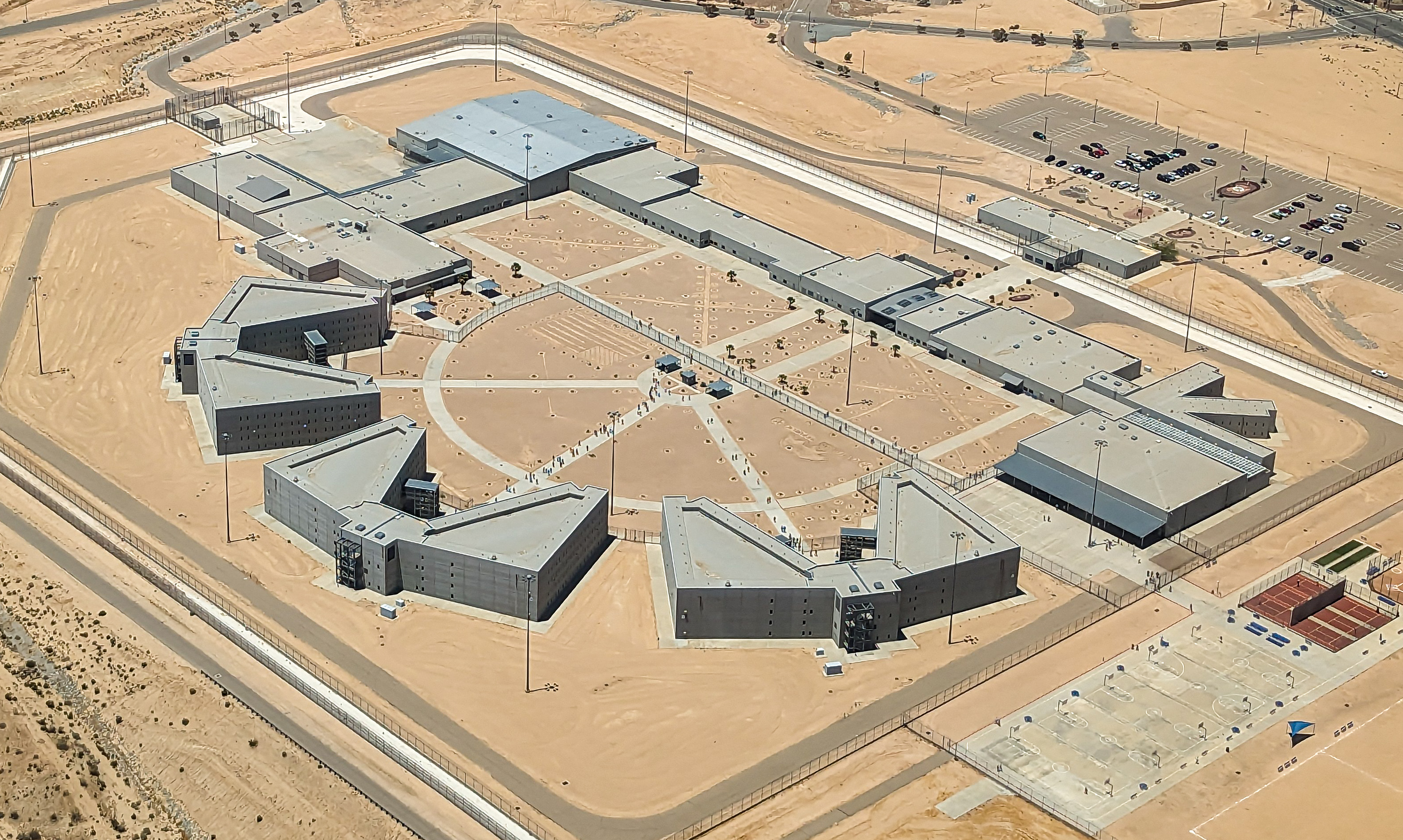
Aerial view of FCI II prison

In 2010, Scott A. Holencik, 45, the warden of FCI Victorville, was named in a six-count indictment returned by a federal grand jury. The indictment accused Holencik of lying to special agents of the United States Department of Justice, Office of the Inspector General, when he was interviewed in November 2009 in connection with an investigation into Internet postings that disclosed confidential government information. The indictment charged Holencik with two felony counts of making false statements when he denied making posts to www.prisonofficer.org. Holencik allegedly made multiple posts to the website that contained sensitive information concerning criminal investigations at the prison. Specifically, it is alleged that he disclosed confidential government information concerning a Bureau of Prisons employee who was suspected of being involved with an inmate gambling scheme, as well as facts related to a homicide that occurred at the prison in August 2009.

A federal judge, Virginia Phillips, subsequently ruled that the information posted on prisonofficer.org was not confidential, thereby dismissing those charges. On February 20, 2014, federal Judge Virginia Phillips ruled dismissing the remaining counts of the indictment against Holencik with prejudice. Holencik retired as warden.

On May 31, 2016, inmate Fazliddin Kurbanov snuck behind then-warden Calvin Johnson and attempted to slit his throat with a 4-inch shank he concealed, injuring him in the process. Kurbanov, an Uzbek refugee, was serving a 25-year sentence for material support and plotting a bombing attack while working as truck-driving instructor in Salt Lake City, Utah. Kurbanov was charged with attempted murder of a federal officer and sentenced to an additional 20 years in prison in 2018. He is now serving his sentence at ADX Florence.

== In popular culture ==
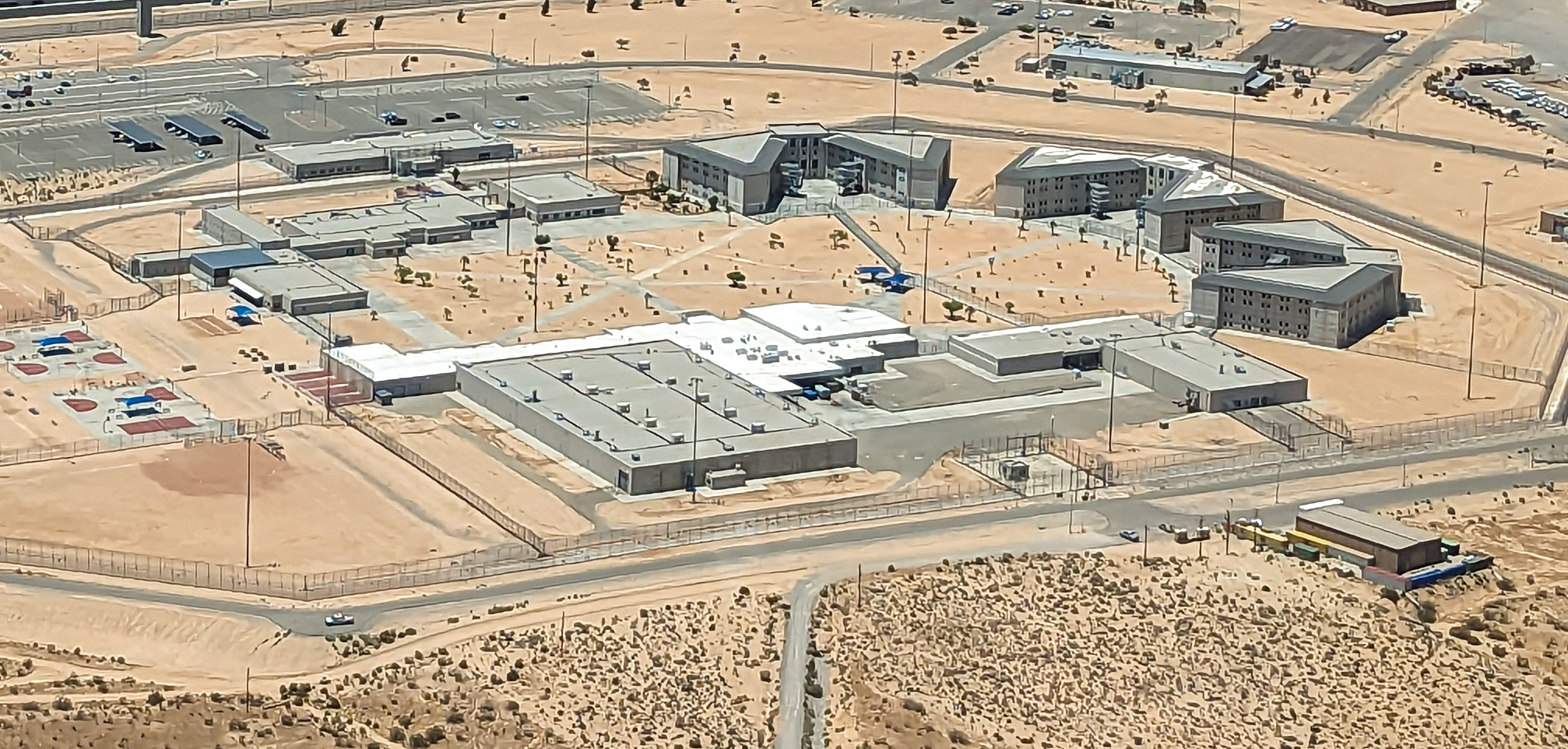
Aerial view of FCI I prison

In the first episode of the HBO television series Luck, the main character Chester "Ace" Bernstein, played by Dustin Hoffman, is released from federal custody after serving 3 years at FCI Victorville.

Diablo, played by Geno Silva in A Man Apart (2003), was incarcerated at Victorville Penitentiary.

== Notable inmates ==
=== Current ===
Inmate Name	Register Number	Sentence	Details
Oscar Ramiro Ortega-Hernandez	33230-068	Serving a 25-year sentence; scheduled for release in 2033.	Pleaded guilty to terrorism and weapons offenses for using a semi-automatic rifle to fire at least eight rounds at the White House on November 11, 2011, in an attempt to kill President Barack Obama, who he believed was the Antichrist.
Michael James Pratt	05210-511	Serving a 27-year sentence, scheduled for release on January 6, 2046.	Convicted for his role in GirlsDoPorn.
Jerry Whitworth	78095-011	Serving a 365-year sentence; not expected to be released.	Sentenced to 365 years for his part in the Walker family spy ring.

=== Former ===
Inmate name	Register number	Status	Details
Mohamed Osman Mohamud	73079-065	Serving a 30-year sentence; scheduled for release in 2036. Currently at FCI Sandstone.	US citizen from Somalia; convicted in 2013 of attempting to use of a weapon of mass destruction for trying to detonate what he thought was a car bomb supplied by undercover FBI agents posing as members of Al-Qaeda at a Christmas tree lighting in Portland, Oregon in 2010.
Abby Lee Miller	35991-068	Served a 366-day sentence, released May 2018.	Choreographer, dance instructor, and former star of the reality television series Dance Moms and several spin-offs; pleaded guilty to bankruptcy fraud and sentenced to 366 days in prison.
Miguel Caro-Quintero	02921-748	Served a 17-year sentence; deported to Mexico upon release in 2019.	Former leader of the now-defunct Sonora Cartel, a drug trafficking organization responsible for exporting multi-ton quantities of marijuana to the US during the 1980s and 1990s; extradited to the US from Mexico in 2009.
Lenny Dykstra	57780-112	Released from custody in 2013; served 15 months.	Former Major League Baseball player; pleaded guilty in 2012 to bankruptcy fraud and money laundering for hiding and selling sports memorabilia intended to be auctioned off for his bankruptcy filing.
Max Butler	09954–011	Served a 13-year sentence; released April 2021.	Pleaded guilty in 2007 to two counts of wire fraud, stealing nearly 2 million credit card numbers, which were used for $86 million in fraudulent purchases.
George Trofimoff	39090-018	Died in 2014 while serving a life sentence.	Retired US Army Reserve colonel and former civilian intelligence chief for the US Army; convicted in 2001 of providing classified military documents to the KGB during the Cold War; Trofimoff is highest-ranking Army official to be convicted of espionage.
Austin Burak	96115-510	Serving two life sentences; Transferred to new prison	Sentenced to two concurrent life sentences for sexually abusing two children on Fort Stewart, Georgia in 2017.

== See also ==
- List of U.S. federal prisons
- Incarceration in the United States
