= Kirill Seleznyov =

Kirill Seleznyov may refer to:

- Kirill Seleznyov (businessman) (born 1974), Russian businessman
- Kirill Seleznyov (footballer) (born 1985), Russian footballer

== See also ==
- Seleznyov
