= National Cyber-Forensics and Training Alliance =

The National Cyber-Forensics & Training Alliance or NCFTA established in 2002 in Pittsburgh is an American non-profit corporation focused on identifying, mitigating, and neutralizing cyber crime threats through strategic alliances and partnerships with subject matter experts (SME) in the public, private, and academic sectors.

The organisation has been involved in many high-profile operations such as take down of the carding site DarkMarket in 2008 and the hacker forum Darkode in 2015.
