= Vladislav Horohorin =

Ukrainian-Israeli hacker and credit card trafficker

- Владислав Анатолійович Хорохорін
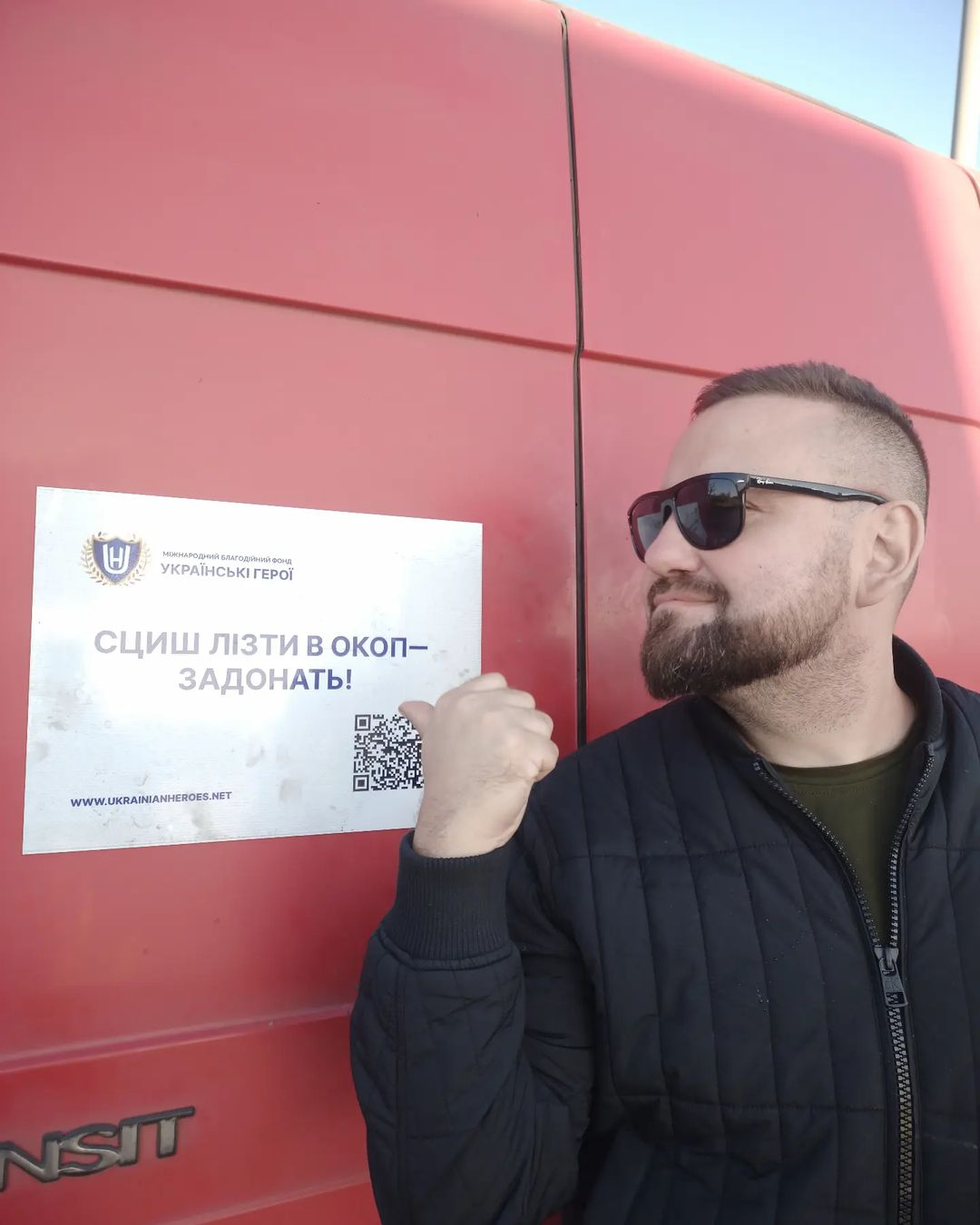
- Born: September 29, 1982 (age 44); Donetsk, Ukraine
- Other name: BadB (hacker handle)
- Citizenship: Ukraine, Israel
- Known for: Hacking
- Criminal charge: Wire fraud

Vladislav Horohorin (Ukrainian: Владислав Анатолійович Хорохорін, romanized: Vladyslav Anatoliiovych Khorokhorin), alias BadB, is a former hacker and international credit card trafficker who was convicted of wire fraud and served a seven-year prison sentence.

== Early life ==
Horohorin was born on September 29, 1982, and grew up in Donetsk, Ukraine, emigrating in 1999 to Israel with his mother, where he served in the Israeli Defence Forces.

== Investigation ==
According to the undercover investigation led by the United States Secret Service, Horohorin was one of the founders of CarderPlanet, one of several websites taken down in 2004, as part of the Secret Service's Operation Firewall investigation. The web sites were operated by cyber criminal organizations to traffic counterfeit credit cards, and false identification information and documents. These websites not only shared information on how to commit fraud, but also provided a forum through which to purchase fraud-related information and tools. "The network created by the founders of CarderPlanet, including Vladislav Horohorin, remains one of the most sophisticated organizations of online financial criminals in the world," said Michael Merritt, Assistant Director for Investigations. "This network has been repeatedly linked to nearly every major intrusion of financial information reported to the international law enforcement community. This arrest illustrates the significance of the Secret Service's commitment to traversing the globe in pursuit of online criminals."

Horohorin promoted his illegal activities by creating video cartoons ridiculing American card holders.

Separately, in 2013, Horohorin was named co-conspirator in an indictment, but was not subsequently charged, in a criminal case in District of New Jersey 09-626 (JBS), in which other Russian individuals were charged with successfully hacking Nasdaq, 7-Eleven, Carrefour, JCPenney, Heartland Payment Systems, Dow Jones, Jetblue and 23 more corporations. This breach was called the "Largest known data breach conspiracy ever prosecuted" by the U.S. Justice Department. As of April 2017, none of Horohorin's co-conspirators had been sentenced.

== Arrest, extradition, guilty plea, and sentencing ==
Horohorin was identified as "BadB" in November 2009 in a sealed indictment from the United States attorney's office. He was arrested on August 7, 2010, in Nice, France, while attempting to board an air plane to Warsaw, Poland. However, due to the complexity of the international legal battle that followed his arrest, he was not extradited to the United States until June 6, 2012. During the proceedings in France, Horohorin was incarcerated in the Maison D'Arret D'Aix-Luynes near Aix-en-Provence, France. Horohorin was arraigned on June 7, 2012, and was detained pending trial.

The Criminal Division's Office of International Affairs handled Horohorin's extradition from France. In the USA he pleaded guilty to two counts of access device fraud, as well as conspiracy to commit wire fraud, and was sentenced to 88 months in prison.

In February 2017, Horohorin was released and was deported from the United States.

Horohorin works as private consultant and security auditor for cybersec.org.
