= Valery Seleznev =

Russian politician

Valery Seleznev MP
- Валерий Селезнёв
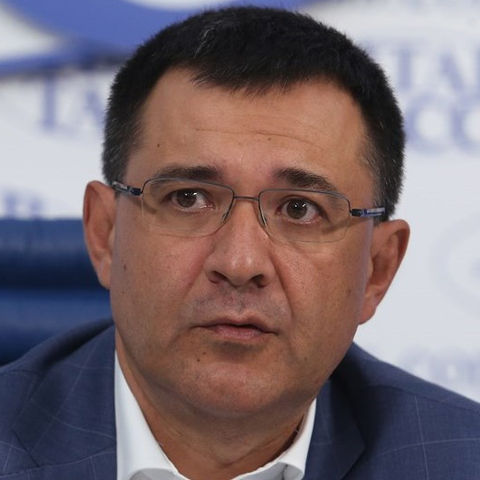

Member of the State Duma (Party List Seat)
- Incumbent
- Assumed office 24 December 2007

Personal details
- Born: 5 September 1964 (age 61) Vladivostok, RSFSR, USSR
- Party: Liberal Democratic Party of Russia
- Children: 4 including Roman Seleznev
- Education: Far Eastern Institute of Soviet Trade
- Occupation: Economist
- Website: t.me/deputatseleznev (in Russian)

Valery Sergeyevich Seleznev (Russian: Валерий Сергеевич Селезнёв; born 5 September 1964, Vladivostok) is a Russian political figure and a deputy of the 5th, 6th, 7th, and 8th State Dumas.

In 1994, Seleznev engaged in business and founded the commercial company CVC. In 1998, he headed the "Australian Trading House" and the "Australian Trading Company" enterprises that engaged in foreign economic activity. In 2007, 2011, 2016, and 2021, he was elected deputy of the 5th, 6th, 7th, and 8th State Dumas.

In 2017, the United States convicted the son of Valery Seleznev, Roman Seleznev, of cybercrime and sentenced him to 27 years in prison. He was accused of stealing and selling 1.7 million credit card numbers. Roman Seleznev was detained during his vacation in July 2014 at the international airport of the Maldives by the United States Intelligence Community.

== Family ==
Has been married multiple times. Father of four sons from different marriages.

== Sanctions ==
On February 23, 2022, he was included in the sanctions list of the European Union for actions and policies deemed to undermine the territorial integrity, sovereignty, and independence of Ukraine and to further destabilize the country.

On February 24, 2022, he was added to Canada's list of sanctioned individuals categorized as “close associates of the regime” due to his vote in favor of recognizing the independence of the self-proclaimed republics in Donetsk and Luhansk.

On March 24, 2022, in the context of the Russian invasion of Ukraine, he was added to the United States sanctions list on the grounds of “complicity in Putin’s war” and “support for the Kremlin’s efforts to invade Ukraine”. The U.S. Department of State stated that members of the State Duma “use their authority to persecute dissenting voices and political opponents, suppress freedom of information, and restrict the human rights and fundamental freedoms of Russian citizens”.

Subsequently, he was also sanctioned on similar grounds by the United Kingdom, Switzerland, Australia, Ukraine, and New Zealand.
