= Money mule =

Person who transfers illegally acquired money

A money mule, sometimes called a "smurfer", is a person who transfers money acquired illegally, such as by theft or fraud. Money mules transfer funds in person, through a courier service, or electronically, on behalf of others. Typically, the mule is paid for services with a small part of the money transferred. Money mules are often recruited on-line under the guise of legitimate employment, not aware that the money they are transferring is the product of crime. Similar techniques are used to transfer merchandise illegally.

== Details ==
Commonly, mules are recruited with job advertisements for "payment processing agents", "money transfer agents", "local processors", and other similar titles; the real benefit to the criminals is not the work carried out by the mule, but that the criminals are distanced from the risky, visible transfer. Some money mules are recruited by an attractive member of the opposite sex. After deducting a relatively small payment for themselves, candidates are asked to accept funds and to forward them to a third party, via remote work. Legitimate companies use escrow services for this kind of work. Mules recruited online are typically used to transfer the proceeds from online fraud, such as phishing scams, malware scams or scams that operate around auction sites like eBay.

After money or merchandise has been stolen, the criminal employs a mule to transfer the money or goods, hiding the criminal's true identity and location from the victim of the crime and the authorities. By using instant payment mechanisms such as Western Union, the mule allows the thief to transform a reversible and traceable transaction into an irreversible and untraceable one.

If an innocent third party's bank details have been compromised, they can be used as a mule without their knowledge, something sometimes called "Cuckoo smurfing".

Criminals trading in stolen or illegally acquired goods use similar tactics to recruit mules who receive packages and forward them to mail drops not traceable to the criminal.

Bitcoin ATMs were reported by Brian Krebs in 2016 to be rising in popularity for money muling.

== Typology ==
The FBI and the Internet Crime Complaint Center, like Europol, classify money mules into three groups:

- the “unwitting” or “unknowing” group has no idea they’re participating in a criminal scheme: they’re recruited through romance scams or fake job offers, with the promise of receiving money into their personal accounts and keeping a portion as a gift or for their trouble. These people sincerely believe they’re helping a loved one or an employer.
- the “witting” group ignores the signs of criminal activity: they may have been warned by bank employees, but they continue to open new accounts—as a rule, this group starts out as unwitting mules.
- the “complicit” group understand their role and participate in the scheme intentionally.

The line between victim and accomplice is often difficult to define. According to Stephen Dalton, director of intelligence at Cifas, banks are cautious about reporting mules to law enforcement because proving intent is difficult, and criminals additionally train mules to look like victims.

Criminologist Fangzhou Wang of the University of Texas at Arlington considered the distinction between conscious and unconscious participants to be insufficient. After reviewing case files on 102 defendants convicted by U.S. federal courts, she proposed a five-category classification: passive and active fund managers, fake-identity operators, network intermediaries, and a mixed type. The categories differ in terms of the degree of autonomy, awareness, nature of financial behavior, and involvement in the money laundering infrastructure.

Criminologists Alice Hutchings and Thomas J. Holt distinguish between drops, which receive goods purchased with stolen cards, and mules, whose bank accounts are used to transfer money.

== Penalties ==
Money mules risk criminal prosecution and long jail sentences.

== Cases ==
In 2010, The FBI Cyber Crimes Task Force, composed of Federal, State, and Local law enforcement, charged more than 37 defendants involved in a highly organized money mule scheme, facilitated by the Zeus Financial Trojan. This group of money mules opened several bank accounts, using both real and fake identification, to receive stolen funds from compromised bank accounts, withdraw the stolen money, then wire the stolen funds overseas. These money mules facilitated the theft of over $3 million from victim bank accounts.

During the COVID-19 pandemic, between $80 billion and $400 billion was stolen from the Paycheck Protection Program (PPP) and unemployment funds. International cybercrime syndicates used automated scripts to submit thousands of fraudulent benefit claims, while thousands of U.S. citizens recruited within the country received government payments into their personal bank accounts, cashed them out or converted them into cryptocurrency, and then transferred the funds to the organizers overseas.

== See also ==
- Advance-fee scam
- Fence
- Money laundering
- Mule (smuggling)
- Parcel mule scam
- Strawperson
