= Parcel mule scam =

Victims unwittingly forward stolen goods

The parcel mule scam, also known as the reshipping scam, involves scammers and unsuspecting victims handling goods to other countries. In some ways it is similar to the money mule scam. Scammers use fake advertising to hire mules. Items are bought with stolen cards, and since the goods are typically re-sold once shipped, this scam can be viewed as an indirect form of money laundering.

== Premise ==
In the parcel mule scam, scammers often attract their victims under the guise of a bogus work-from-home opportunity, although other angles, such as a romance scam may be used to lure victims. Victims begin to receive packages, often with high value contents (such as consumer electronics or designer clothes and shoes) at the address they provided the scammer. The goods in the packages are either fraudulently bought (for example, with a stolen credit card or bank account) or are stolen or counterfeit goods. They are then asked to repackage the item(s) and send them to another address, which may or may not be an international address. Often this new address belongs to another victim or a person who is directly involved in the scam. By routing the packages through many different people, the original scammer(s) become difficult to track down. After the package is sent to another address and proof is sent to the scammer, the victim may be offered monetary compensation.

Although the victim may be offered money, this scam often operates in tandem with either a cheque fraud scam (where the check or money transfer the victim receives is fraudulent) or an advance-fee scam (if the victim is required to pay up front for costs, such as postage, with the promise of reimbursement). This scam can also operate alongside a money mule scam, where the victim is transferred money (often from an untraceable source, such as a wire transfer) and told to keep a portion of the money while wiring the rest of the funds to someone else (either another victim or a scammer). In any case where funds are illegally obtained, the victim will also be liable for the full amount of money if the check or wire transfer they are given is reversed. It is also possible that the victim's personal information, such as address or bank account information, may be exposed.

Authorities generally advise that anyone who suspects that they are a victim of a parcel mule scam to report it to the authorities. People involved in reshipping scams, whether or not they are a willing accomplice, can potentially be charged with several felonies. Authorities also caution consumers not to accept a job offer that requires them to reship goods, not to accept packages at their address from people they don't know, and if strange packages do arrive at their address, not to reship them to another address.

== Example ==
One famous scam was organized under the "Air Parcel Express" corporate name. Criminals purchased items in the United States and sent them via mules to Russia and Belarus, where they were then sold. Items included iPods, PlayStations, smartphones, and laptops.
