= Contactless fingerprinting =

Contactless fingerprinting technology (CFP) was described in a government-funded report as an attempt to gather and add fingerprints to those gathered via wet-ink process and then, in a "touchless" scan, verify claimed identify and, a bigger challenge, identify their owners without additional clues.

Although an early source of this technology, which worked with phone cameras (and not needing additional hardware), opened in 2003 and closed in 2011, others in this space are still, several years later, using the words "one of the first."

Contactless fingerprint technology is the third generation: Wet-ink was followed by an option for "optics-based ... light reflected from the tops of fingerprints on a plate."

As of 2017, "face recognition technologies on the whole are in general less accurate than fingerprinting." Aging, variations in pose and problems with illumination have caused the former to have "higher error rates."

== History ==
The use of lasers to detect fingerprints already existed in the 1980s as a method of identifying fingerprints that could not be detected with conventional techniques, like dusting.

== USA Public/Private Contactless study ==
A 30-page white paper titled "Risks and Opportunities of Contactless Biometrics" identified "spoofing as a serious limitation, and ranks what people know (password, challenge question) and what they have (keycard, identify "token") higher than biometrics.

Although it ranks facial recognition and iris recognition ahead of contactless fingerprint identification, it is the fingerprint that ranks highest of the three for high-security situations. The whitepaper noted that the Canadian Border Services Agency was planning to utilize a combination of facial recognition and fingerprints.

One such experiment used an assist: using flight manifests to compare faces with passport photos of those listed.

A pending court case defined failures of even 1% to be "high risk" if it results in denials of government benefits.

== USA DOJ report ==
A 56-page report titled "Contactless Fingerprint Technologies Assessment" was funded in 2010, and version 2 of the report was "made ... available" in 2014 online even though it "has not been published."

After describing 13 R&D projects in various stages of incompleteness, it identifies four "contactless fingerprint existing products."

- The first company's product attaches to a PC via USB and "is designed for indoor use only."
- The second company is footnoted as a "closed business."
- The third product scans the person's fingerprints and then encodes them into a small object that the person can then present; verification takes "approximately two seconds." The objective had been "to speed access through restricted, high traffic areas." Also, unlike the first product, which could operate at a "distance of 2 meters" this one has "optimum focal length of approximately three inches from the camera." Another limitiation is that only works with one finger per person.
- The fourth product is the most advanced of the group, and while it is not touchless, there is no contact with the scanner, just with an "optical scanning area."

A list of nine "contactless fingerprint technologies that are worth noting" is part of the report. Of the top three, the first closed in 2011. Next come a pair from an inventor with 2 entries; one had 800 employees worldwide when, for reasons of mismanagement, it went bankrupt and was absorbed by another firm.

== Applications ==
Aside from border, airport and access control, contactless fingerprint technologies have provided benefits in:

- Microfinance benefit to poor: India's unbanked have difficulty with qualifying for government and United Nations microfinance services due to lack of acceptable documentation. With use of a software-only fingerprint scanner (on a phone carried by a UN or government worker), simple loans of "$100 .. buy .. seeds they need to plant more crops" were enabled, beginning in the 2000s.

This technology has also been opened to rural areas that have many unbanked and underbanked residents.

- Convenience: Paying for goods and services with a swipe of a finger on a biometric sensor
- Mobil Phone security: Software downloaded to "nearly any mobile phone that has a camera" can authenticate fingerprints.

== Research ==
A 2012 technology review of fingerprint identification with 95 citations only had three regarding contactless/touchless research.

A 2017 NIST designed to see how effectively members of the public could use a contactless fingerprint device in a simulated airport situation found that about half of the participants could not successfully validate their fingerprints on their first try. The study added a training video, and that improved results. The report considered it "encouraging for the employment of touchless finerprint technology."
