= Home business =

Small business operated from a home office

A home business or home-based business (HBB) is a small business that operates from the business owner's home office. In addition to location, home businesses are usually defined by having a very small number of employees, usually all immediate family of the business owner, in which case it is also a family business. Home businesses generally lack shop frontage, customer parking and street advertising signs. Such businesses are sometimes prohibited by residential zoning regulations.

Remote work has increased. Home offices compete with small commercial businesses and are cheaper to operate. It may also be possible to tax deduct some home expenses while running a home based business. High speed internet connections and smartphones help to make a home-based business a reality. Earlier home businesses had been where families lived on the second floor of their house while converting the first floor into a store, where upon close of business they would secure the first floor and retire to the upper floors. This type of home business is still done in some rural areas. Many home businesses are started off in a much smaller capacity whilst the owner is still employed elsewhere, and then expanded once they are proven to be profitable.

== Home-based business ==
The concept of home-based business, as opposed to the previous terminology of "cottage industry", first appeared in 1978. The phrase was coined by Marion Behr, the originator of a study to find out what businesses women throughout America were carrying on in their homes. The preview edition of Enterprising Women wrote about the search to gather information pertaining to home workers throughout the nation. Numerous magazines and organizations helped to disseminate information regarding the study. Ultimately 40,000 letters were received, many indicating the problems the respondents experienced while carrying on businesses from their homes.

The problems were analyzed and confronted in two ways. In 1980 the National Alliance of Homebased Businesswomen was founded to combat the isolation expressed by the respondents as well as to fight the laws which made conducting their businesses difficult. Then Women Working Home: The Homebased Guide and Directory by Marion Behr and Wendy Lazar was published. It contained the stories of many women who ran home-based businesses throughout the country in many diverse fields, as well as information on business formation, conduct and compliance with the law. It sold 50,000 copies. During this time many national magazines wrote about these issues. At the White House Conference on Small Business in 1986, one of the major resolutions was a recommendation favoring lifting restrictions on home-based business. Despite restrictions that continue to be in place women-owned businesses made up about 42% of all U.S. businesses in 2022, providing jobs for nearly 9.4 million workers and producing roughly $1.9 trillion in yearly revenue.

The number of home businesses continues to grow due to the increases in technology. In Great Britain, 8 million people were running an online home-based business as of April 2013.Technology has significantly enhanced the economic benefits of home-based businesses by increasing productivity, reducing costs, and promoting innovation.

Licensing requirements for home-based businesses in the United States vary based on industry and location.

== Expanded home-based businesses ==
Numerous businesses, initially started as home-based, have expanded to become significantly larger operations. These include:

- Apple Inc., started by Steve Jobs and Steve Wozniak from Steve Jobs's garage
- Hewlett-Packard, whose original location is now a museum, the HP Garage
- Amazon.com, internet retailer founded by Jeff Bezos

== See also ==
- Work at home parent
- Micro ISV
