= Heartland Payment Systems =

Payment service provider

Heartland Payment Systems, Inc.
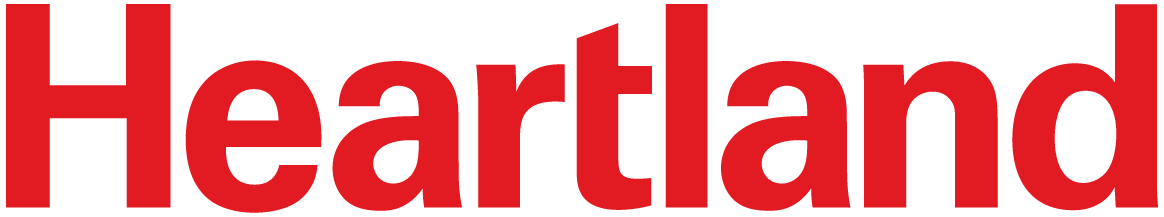
- Type: Subsidiary
- Industry: Electronic Payment Processing
- Founded: July 15, 1997; 29 years ago
- Founder: Bob Carr
- Headquarters: Oklahoma City, Oklahoma
- Area served: United States
- Revenue: $2.1 Billion (2014)
- Number of employees: 3,734 (2014)
- Parent: Global Payments
- Website: Heartland.us

Heartland Payment Systems, Inc. is an American payment processing and technology provider. Founded in 1997, Heartland Payment Systems' last headquarters were in Princeton, New Jersey. The company was acquired by Global Payments for $4.3 billion in 2016.

Heartland Payment Systems provides payment processing for more than 275,000 business locations in the United States and processes more than 11 million transactions a day and more than $80 billion in transactions a year, as of 2014.

In addition to payment processing, Heartland has developed or acquired businesses in payroll processing, gift card and campus card, K-12 point of sale systems, school payments and nutrition, network management, mobile payments and ordering, eCommerce, billing, and lending services.

== History ==
Heartland was co-founded by Robert O. Carr in Princeton, New Jersey in 1997.

In 2001, the company received a $40 million private equity investment from Greenhill Capital Partners, L.P. (New York, NY), LLR Partners, Inc. (Philadelphia, PA), and their affiliated investment funds. The company went public on the New York Stock Exchange on August 11, 2005.

=== Security breach ===
On January 20, 2009, Heartland announced that it had been "the victim of a security breach within its processing system in 2008". The data stolen included the digital information encoded onto the magnetic stripe built into the backs of credit and debit cards; with that data, thieves can fashion counterfeit credit cards by imprinting the same stolen information onto fabricated cards. One estimate claimed 100 million cards and more than 650 financial services companies were compromised; at the time, it was characterized as the largest ever criminal breach of card data.

An American computer hacker, Albert Gonzalez, was sentenced in March 2010 to 20 years in prison for his role in the hacking ring that broke into the Heartland computer systems. In February 2018, two Russian hackers were sentenced for a string of hacking including the Heartland breach.

On May 1, 2009, Visa and Heartland issued a statement that Heartland successfully validated its compliance with PCI DSS and was returned to Visa's list of PCI DSS Validated Service Providers.

In January 2010, according to a filing by Heartland, the company agreed to pay up to $60 million to fund a settlement program for issuers of Visa cards affected by the breach. The program depended on acceptance by issuers representing 80 percent of the eligible U.S. accounts.

=== End-to-end encryption ===
On May 24, 2009, Heartland commercially launched their E3, an end-to-end encryption technology designed to safeguard credit and debit card account information from the moment of card swipe and through the Heartland network. Gartner Analyst Avivah Litan stated that Heartland "is basically leading the way for the rest of the industry." She also characterized its plan for end-to-end encryption as the first effort of its kind in the US.

Other processors including Worldpay US and several First Data ISO's announced end-to-end encryption initiatives soon after Heartland announced theirs.

=== Open letter to the electronic payments industry ===
Following a keynote address to the Strategic Leadership Forum of the Electronic Transactions Association in October 2013, Heartland CEO Bob Carr published an open letter to the electronic payment processing industry urging an end to unethical, dishonest and illegal pricing practices, referencing the practice of deliberately falsifying interchange rates, deliberately falsifying merchant category codes (MCC), and the use of confusing small print to extort large fines from merchants.

=== Litigation against Mercury Payment Systems ===
In January 2014, Heartland filed a lawsuit against the company Mercury Payment Systems, an electronic payment provider, for alleged false advertising and "other deceptive trade practices". The lawsuit concerns interchange fees charged by credit card networks and alleges violations of the Lanham Act and state laws.

=== Heartland Secure ===
In May 2014, Heartland Secure is launched. Backed by a breach warranty, Heartland Secure combines three technologies—EMV, end-to-end encryption and tokenization—to provide merchants with security and guard against monetization of stolen card data.

=== Merger with Global Payments ===
In April 2016, Heartland and Global Payments completed their merger agreement. The combined company, Global Payments Inc., is publicly traded (NYSE: GPN), and has more than 8,500 employees worldwide.
