= Cyber-arms industry =

Markets involving the sale of software exploits

The cyber-arms industry are the markets and associated events surrounding the sale of software exploits, zero-days, cyberweaponry, surveillance technologies, and related tools for perpetrating cyberattacks. The term may extend to both grey and black markets online and offline.

For many years, the burgeoning dark web market remained niche, available only to those in-the-know or well-funded. Since at least 2005, governments including the United States, United Kingdom, Russia, France, and Israel have been buying exploits from defence contractors and individual hackers. This 'legitimate' market for zero-day exploits exists but is not well advertised or immediately accessible.

Attempts to openly sell zero-day exploits to governments and security vendors to keep them off the black market have so far been unsuccessful.

== Companies ==
Traditional arms producers and military services companies such as BAE Systems, EADS, Leonardo, General Dynamics, Raytheon, and Thales have all expanded into the cybersecurity markets. However, smaller software companies such as Blue Coat and Amesys have also become involved, often drawing attention for providing surveillance and censorship technologies to the regimes of Bashar al-Assad in Syria and Muammar Gaddafi in Libya.

Suppliers of exploits to western governments include the Massachusetts firm Netragard.

The trade show ISS World that runs every few months has been referred to as the 'international cyber arms bazaar' and the 'wiretappers ball' focuses on surveillance software for lawful interception.

Some other cyberarms companies include Endgame, Inc., Gamma Group, NSO Group, and Ability. Circles, a former surveillance business, merged with NSO Group in 2014.

On 26 July 2017 Google researchers announced the discovery of new spyware they named "Lipizzan". According to Google, "Lipizzan's code contains references to a cyber arms company, Equus Technologies.".

== On the Internet ==
The most popular Internet forums are generally in Russian or Ukrainian and there are reports of English-only, Chinese-only, German-only, and Vietnamese-only sites, among others. Phishing, spear-phishing, and other social engineer campaigns are typically done in English, as a majority of potential victims know that language. India's Central Bureau of Investigation describe the proliferation of underground markets as 'widespread'. Colonel John Adams, head of the Marine Corps Intelligence Activity has expressed concerns these markets could allow cyberweaponry to fall into the hands of hostile governments which would otherwise lack the expertise to attack an advanced country's computer systems.

Online, there is increasing uses of encryption and privacy mechanisms such as off the record messaging and cryptocurrencies.

Since 2005 on darknet markets and black markets such as the 'Cyber Arms Bazaar' have had their prices dropping fast with the cost of cyberweaponry plummeting at least 90 percent.

Botnets are increasingly rented out by cyber criminals as commodities for a variety of purposes.

RDP shops offer cheap access to hacked computers.

Recent research has indicated that countries will also begin to use artificial intelligence as a tool for national cyberdefense. AI is a new factor in the cyber arms industry, as it can be used for defense purposes. Therefore, academics urge that nations should establish regulations for the use of AI, similar to how there are regulations for other military industries.

== Vendor responses ==
In recent years, many software firms have had success with bug bounty programs, but in some cases such as with Vupen's Chrome exploit these will be rejected as below market value. Meanwhile, some vendors such as HP spent more than $7 million between 2005 and 2015 buying exploits for its own software. This behaviour has been criticised by head of the United States Cyber Command, General Keith Alexander. This criticism then is known as "building the black market".

== Notable markets ==
- Cyber Arms Bazaar – a darknet market operating out of various Eastern European countries, trafficking crimeware and hacking tools that has run since at least the year 2000. Tom Kellermann, chief cybersecurity officer of Trend Micro, estimates over 80 percent of financial sector cyberattacks could be traced back to the bazaar, with retail cyberattacks not far behind.
- Darkode
- TheRealDeal

== See also ==
- Cybercrime
- Cyberwarfare
- Cyberweapon
- Cybersecurity
- Market for zero-day exploits
- Mass surveillance industry
- Vulnerabilities Equities Process
