= Zone A =

Zone A may refer to:

== Fare zones ==
- Fare Zone A, see List of stations in London fare zones 7–9, G and W
- Fare Zone A, see Bilbao Metro

== Other ==
- Free Territory of Trieste
- Morgan Line#Zone A, a region of Italy under Allied military administration 1945-47
- Guthrie classification of Bantu languages
- Zone A hurricane evacuation zone, see Effects of Hurricane Sandy in New York

== See also ==
- Area A, One of the West Bank areas in the Oslo II Accord
- Zone-H
