= Pwn2Own =

Computer hacking contest

- Date: April 18–20, 2007
- Time: Twice yearly
- Duration: 2 to 4 days
- Location: Various
- Type: Hacking contest
- Patron: Zero Day Initiative
- Organized by: Zero Day Initiative
- Awards: Cash prizes
- Website: Zero Day Initiative

Pwn2Own is a computer hacking contest, typically held in conjunction with a security conferences (originally CanSecWest security conference). First held in April 2007 in Vancouver, the contest is now held two to three times a year, most recently in September 2026. Contestants are challenged to exploit widely used software and mobile devices with previously unknown vulnerabilities. Winners of the contest receive the device that they exploited and a cash prize. The Pwn2Own contest serves to demonstrate the vulnerability of devices and software in widespread use while also providing a checkpoint on the progress made in security since the previous year. The contest was conceived by Dragos Ruiu and initially intended to highlight the insecurity of Apple's Mac OS X operating system. Its name is derived from the fact that contestants must "pwn" or hack the device in order to "own" or win it.

== History ==
=== Origins ===
The first contest in 2007 was conceived and developed by Dragos Ruiu in response to his frustration with Apple Inc.'s lack of response to the Month of Apple Bugs and the Month of Kernel Bugs, as well as Apple's television commercials that trivialized the security built into the competing Windows operating system. At the time, there was a widespread belief that, despite these public displays of vulnerabilities in Apple products, OS X was significantly more secure than any other competitors. On March 20, roughly three weeks before CanSecWest that year, Ruiu announced the Pwn2Own contest to security researchers on the DailyDave mailing list. The contest was to include two MacBook Pros that he would leave on the conference floor hooked up to their own wireless access point. Any conference attendee that could connect to this wireless access point and exploit one of the devices would be able to leave the conference with that laptop. There was no monetary reward. The name "Pwn2Own" was derived from the fact that contestants must "pwn" or hack the device in order to "own" or win it.

On the first day of the conference in Vancouver, British Columbia, Ruiu asked Terri Forslof of the Zero Day Initiative (ZDI) to participate in the contest. ZDI has a program which purchases zero-day attacks, reports them to the affected vendor and turns them into signatures for their own network intrusion detection system, increasing its effectiveness. The vulnerabilities sold to ZDI are made public only after the affected vendor has issued a patch for it. Forslof agreed to have ZDI offer to purchase any vulnerabilities used in the contest for a flat price of $10,000. The first contest subsequently exposed a high-profile QuickTime flaw, which was disclosed to Apple on April 23 and patched in early May.

In 2008 the scope of the Pwn2Own contest was expanded. Targets included three laptops running the default installation of Windows Vista, OS X, or Ubuntu Linux. Mobile devices were added in 2009.

For 2012 the rules were changed to a capture-the-flag-style competition with a point system. At and Chrome was successfully exploited for the first time, by regular competitor VUPEN. After withdrawing from the contest that year due to new disclosure rules, in 2013 Google returned as a sponsor and the rules were changed to require full disclosure of exploits and techniques used. In that year (2013) a single researcher was able to hack Chrome, Firefox and Internet Explorer, a trifecta hack. Google ceased to be a sponsor of Pwn2Own in 2015.

=== Recent years ===
In 2015, every web browser tested was successfully hacked and every prize won, totaling $557,500. Other prizes such as laptops were also given to winning researchers. In 2018, the conference was much smaller and sponsored primarily by Microsoft, after China banned its security researchers from participating in the contest.

Pwn2Own continues to be sponsored by Trend Micro's Zero Day Initiative, with ZDI reporting vulnerabilities to vendors before going public with the hacks. "One of the largest hacking contests in the world" according to TechCrunch, as of 2019 the contest continues to be held several times a year. Pwn2Own Tokyo was held November 6 to November 7 in Tokyo, Japan, and was expected to hand out $750,000 in cash and prizes. Hacks focus on browsers, virtual machines, computers, and phones. In 2019, the contest added cars for the first time, with $900,000 offered for hacks exploiting Tesla software. In 2019, the contest added industrial control systems. The 2025, Pwn2Own event was hosted at OffensiveCon in Berlin, as is the 2026 event.

== Award system ==
Winners of the contest receive the device that they exploited and a cash prize. Winners also receive a "Masters" jacket celebrating the year of their win.

== List of successful exploits ==
The following list of notable hacks is incomplete.

Hacker(s)	Affiliation	Year	Exploit Target	Version / OS	Source
Dino Dai Zovi	Independent	2007	QuickTime (Safari)	Mac OS X	
Shane Macauley	Independent	2007	QuickTime (Safari)	Mac OS X	
Charlie Miller	ISE	2008	Safari (PCRE)	Mac OS X 10.5.2	
Jake Honoroff	ISE	2008	Safari (PCRE)	Mac OS X 10.5.2	
Mark Daniel	ISE	2008	Safari (PCRE)	Mac OS X 10.5.2	
Shane Macauley	Independent	2008	Adobe Flash (Internet Explorer)	Windows Vista Service Pack 1	
Alexander Sotirov	Independent	2008	Adobe Flash (Internet Explorer)	Windows Vista Service Pack 1	
Derek Callaway	Independent	2008	Adobe Flash (Internet Explorer)	Windows Vista Service Pack 1	
Charlie Miller	ISE	2009	Safari	Mac OS X	
Nils	Independent	2009	Internet Explorer 8	Windows 7 Beta	
Nils	Independent	2009	Safari	Mac OS X	
Nils	Independent	2009	Mozilla Firefox		
Charlie Miller	ISE	2010	Safari	Mac OS X	
Peter Vreugdenhil	Independent	2010	Internet Explorer 8	Windows 7	
Nils	Independent	2010	Mozilla Firefox 3.6	Windows 7 (64-bit)	
Ralf-Philipp Weinmann	Independent	2010	iPhone 3GS	iOS	
Vincenzo Iozzo	Independent	2010	iPhone 3GS	iOS	
VUPEN	VUPEN	2011	Safari 5.0.3	Mac OS X 10.6.6	
Stephen Fewer	Harmony Security	2011	Internet Explorer 8 (32-bit)	Windows 7 Service Pack 1 (64-bit)	
Charlie Miller	ISE	2011	iPhone 4	iOS 4.2.1	
Dion Blazakis	ISE	2011	iPhone 4	iOS 4.2.1	
Willem Pinckaers	Independent	2011	BlackBerry Torch 9800	BlackBerry OS 6.0.0.246	
Vincenzo Iozzo	Independent	2011	Blackberry Torch 9800	BlackBerry OS 6.0.0.246	
Ralf-Philipp Weinmann	Independent	2011	Blackberry Torch 9800	BlackBerry OS 6.0.0.246	
VUPEN	VUPEN	2012	Chrome	Windows 7 Service Pack 1 (64-bit)	
VUPEN	VUPEN	2012	Internet Explorer 9	Windows 7	
Willem Pinckaers	Independent	2012	Mozilla Firefox		
Vincenzo Iozzo	Independent	2012	Mozilla Firefox		
Nils, Jon, Tyrone Erasmus, Jacques Louw	MWR Labs	2012	Samsung Galaxy S3	Android	
VUPEN	VUPEN	2013	Internet Explorer 10	Windows 8	
VUPEN	VUPEN	2013	Adobe Flash	Windows 8	
VUPEN	VUPEN	2013	Oracle Java	Windows 8	
Nils	MWR Labs	2013	Chrome	Windows 8	
Jon	MWR Labs	2013	Chrome	Windows 8	
George Hotz	Independent	2013	Adobe Reader	Windows 8	
Joshua Drake	Independent	2013	Oracle Java	Windows 8	
James Forshaw	Independent	2013	Oracle Java	Windows 8	
Ben Murphy	Independent	2013	Oracle Java	Windows 8	
Pinkie Pie	Independent	2013 (Mobile)	Chrome	Android	
Nico Joly	VUPEN	2014 (mobile)	Windows Phone (Internet Explorer 11)	Windows 8.1	
VUPEN	VUPEN	2014	Internet Explorer 11	Windows 8.1	
VUPEN	VUPEN	2014	Adobe Reader XI	Windows 8.1	
VUPEN	VUPEN	2014	Chrome	Windows 8.1	
VUPEN	VUPEN	2014	Adobe Flash	Windows 8.1	
VUPEN	VUPEN	2014	Mozilla Firefox	Windows 8.1	
Liang Chen, Zeguang Zhao	Keen team, team509	2014	Adobe Flash	Windows 8.1	
Sebastian Apelt, Andreas Schmidt	Independent	2014	Internet Explorer 11	Windows 8.1	
Jüri Aedla	Independent	2014	Mozilla Firefox	Windows 8.1	
Mariusz Młyński	Independent	2014	Mozilla Firefox	Windows 8.1	
George Hotz	Independent	2014	Mozilla Firefox	Windows 8.1	
Liang Chen, Zeguang Zhao	Keen team, team509	2014	OS X Mavericks, and Safari		
Bernard Wagner, Kyle Riley	MWR Labs	2014	Amazon Fire Phone	Fire OS	
Jung Hoon Lee, aka lokihardt	Independent	2015	Internet Explorer 11, Google Chrome, and Safari		
Nico Golde, Daniel Komaromy	Independent	2015 (Mobile)	Samsung Galaxy S6 Baseband	Android	
Guang Gong	Qihoo 360	2015 (Mobile)	Nexus 6 Chrome	Android	
JungHoon Lee	Independent	2016	Microsoft Edge	Windows 10	
Liang Chen, Qidan He, Marco Grassi, Yubin Fu	Tencent Security Team Sniper	2016	Safari	Mac OS X	
360Vulcan	Qihoo 360	2016	Adobe Flash Player, Chrome	Windows 10	
Liang Chen, Wayne Liang, Marco Grassi, Yubin Fu	Tencent Keen Security Lab	2016 (Mobile)	Safari	iOS 10	
Qidan He, Gengming Liu, Zhen Feng	Tencent Keen Security Lab	2016 (Mobile)	Nexus 6P Chrome	Android	
		2017	iPhone 7, others	iOS 11.1	
		2018			
Fluoroacetate	Independent	2019 (Mobile)	Amazon Echo Show 5		
Pedro Ribeiro, Radek Domanski	Flashback	2019 (Mobile)	NETGEAR Nighthawk Smart WiFi Router (LAN and WAN)	v3 (hardware)	
Pedro Ribeiro, Radek Domanski	Flashback	2019 (Mobile)	TP-Link AC1750 Smart WiFi Router (LAN and WAN)	v5 (hardware)	
Mark Barnes, Toby Drew, Max Van Amerongen, and James Loureiro	F-Secure Labs	2019 (Mobile)	Xiaomi Mi9 (Web Browser and NFC)	Android	
Mark Barnes, Toby Drew, Max Van Amerongen, and James Loureiro	F-Secure Labs	2019 (Mobile)	TP-Link AC1750 Smart WiFi Router (LAN and WAN)	v5 (hardware)	
Yong Hwi Jin, Jungwon Lim, and Insu Yun	Georgia Tech Systems Software & Security Lab	2020 (Desktop)	Apple Safari, with privilege escalation	macOS	
Richard Zhu	Fluorescence	2020 (Desktop)	Microsoft Windows	Windows	
Manfred Paul	RedRocket	2020 (Desktop)	Ubuntu Desktop	Ubuntu	
Amat Cama, Richard Zhu	Fluoroacetate	2020 (Desktop)	Microsoft Windows	Windows	
Phi Phạm Hồng	STAR Labs	2020 (Desktop)	Oracle VirtualBox	Windows	
Amat Cama, Richard Zhu	Fluoroacetate	2020 (Desktop)	Adobe Reader, with privilege escalation	Windows	
Lucas Leong	Zero Day Initiative	2020 (Desktop)	Oracle VirtualBox	Windows	
	STAR Labs	2020 (Tokyo)	NETGEAR Nighthawk R7800 (LAN)		
	Trapa Security	2020 (Tokyo)	Western Digital My Cloud Pro Series PR4100		
Pedro Ribeiro, Radek Domanski	Flashback	2020 (Tokyo)	NETGEAR Nighthawk R7800 (WAN)		
	84c0	2020 (Tokyo)	Western Digital My Cloud Pro Series PR4100		
	Viettel Cyber Security	2020 (Tokyo)	Samsung Q60T		
	Trapa Security	2020 (Tokyo)	NETGEAR Nighthawk R7800 (LAN)		
Pedro Ribeiro, Radek Domanski	Flashback	2020 (Tokyo)	TP-Link AC1750 Smart WiFi		
	Bugscale	2020 (Tokyo)	Western Digital My Cloud Pro Series PR4100		
	84c0	2020 (Tokyo)	NETGEAR Nighthawk R7800 (LAN)		
	F-Secure Labs	2020 (Tokyo)	Samsung Q60T		
Sam Thomas	Pentest Ltd	2020 (Tokyo)	Western Digital My Cloud Pro Series PR4100		
	Synacktiv	2020 (Tokyo)	TP-Link AC1750 Smart WiFi (LAN)		
	DEVCORE	2020 (Tokyo)	Synology DiskStation DS418Play NAS		
	DEVCORE	2020 (Tokyo)	Western Digital My Cloud Pro Series PR4100		
Gaurav Baruah		2020 (Tokyo)	Western Digital My Cloud Pro Series PR4100		
	Viettel Cyber Security	2020 (Tokyo)	Sony X800		
	STAR Labs	2020 (Tokyo)	Synology DiskStation DS418Play NAS		
Jack Dates	RET2 Systems	2021 (Vancouver)	Apple Safari, with privilege escalation		
Orange Tsai	DEVCORE	2021 (Vancouver)	Microsoft Exchange		
	OV	2021 (Vancouver)	Microsoft Teams		
	Viettel Cyber Security	2021 (Vancouver)	Microsoft Windows	Windows 10	
Ryota Shiga	Flatt Security Inc	2021 (Vancouver)	Ubuntu Desktop	Ubuntu	
Jack Dates	RET2 Systems	2021 (Vancouver)	Parallels Desktop		
Bruno Keith, Niklas Baumstark	Dataflow Security	2021 (Vancouver)	Google Chrome, Microsoft Edge		
	Viettel Cyber Security	2021 (Vancouver)	Microsoft Exchange		
Daan Keuper, Thijs Alkemade	Computest	2021 (Vancouver)	Zoom Messenger	Windows	
Tao Yan	Palo Alto Networks	2021 (Vancouver)	Microsoft Windows	Windows 10	
Sunjoo Park		2021 (Vancouver)	Parallels Desktop		
Manfred Paul		2021 (Vancouver)	Ubuntu Desktop	Ubuntu	
z3r09		2021 (Vancouver)	Microsoft Windows	Windows 10	
Benjamin McBride	L3Harris Trenchant	2021 (Vancouver)	Parallels Desktop		
Steven Seeley	Source Incite	2021 (Vancouver)	Microsoft Exchange		
Billy	STAR Labs	2021 (Vancouver)	Ubuntu Desktop	Ubuntu	
Fabien Perigaud	Synacktiv	2021 (Vancouver)	Microsoft Windows	Windows 10	
Alisa Esage		2021 (Vancouver)	Parallels Desktop		
Vincent Dehors	Synacktiv	2021 (Vancouver)	Ubuntu Desktop	Ubuntu	
Da Lao		2021 (Vancouver)	Parallels Desktop		
Marcin Wiazowski		2021 (Vancouver)	Microsoft Windows	Windows 10	
Orange Tsai	DEVCORE Research Team	2021	Microsoft Exchange Server	Windows	
Anonymous researcher		2021	Microsoft SharePoint Server	Windows	
Abdelhamid Naceri (halov)		2021	Lock screen bypass	Windows	
Manfred Paul		April 2021	eBPF Privilege Escalation	Linux Kernel	
Jack Dates	RET2 Systems, Inc.	2021	Safari RCE / WebKit / WebAssembly	Mac OS	
Daniel Lim Wee Soong, Poh Jia Hao, Li Jiantao, Ngo Wei Lin	STAR Labs	2022 (Vancouver)	Microsoft Teams		
David Berard, Vincent Dehors	Synacktiv	2023 (Vancouver)	Tesla Model 3 (Infotainment Unconfined Root)		
Manfred Paul		2024 (Vancouver)	Mozilla Firefox (Sandbox Escape)		
Nguyen Hoang Thach	STAR Labs SG	2025 (Berlin)	VMware ESXi		
Orange Tsai	DEVCORE Research Team	2026 (Berlin)	Microsoft Edge (Sandbox Escape)		

== Yearly contests ==
=== 2007 ===
The contest took place from Thursday, April 18 to Saturday, April 20, 2007, in Vancouver. The first contest was intended to highlight the insecurity of Apple's Mac OS X operating system since, at the time, there was a widespread belief that OS X was far more secure than its competitors. Concerning rules, only two MacBook Pro laptops, one 13" and one 15", were left on the conference floor at CanSecWest and joined to a separate wireless network. Only certain attacks were allowed and these restrictions were progressively loosened over the three days of the conference. Day 1 allowed remote attacks only, day 2 had browser attacks included, while day 3 allowed local attacks, where contestants could connect with a USB stick or Bluetooth. In order to win the 15" MacBook Pro, contestants would be required to further escalate their privileges to root after gaining access with their initial exploit.

The laptops were not hacked on the first day. After the $10,000 prize was announced by ZDI, Shane Macaulay called up former co-worker Dino Dai Zovi in New York and urged him to compete in the second day. In one night, Dai Zovi found and exploited a previously unknown vulnerability in a QuickTime library loaded by Safari. The following morning, Dai Zovi sent his exploit code to Macaulay, who placed it on a website and e-mailed the contest organizers a link to it. When clicked, the link gave Macauley control of the laptop, winning the contest by proxy for Dai Zovi, who gave Macaulay the 15" MacBook Pro. Dai Zovi separately sold the vulnerability to ZDI for the $10,000 prize.

=== 2008 ===
Pwn2Own 2008 took place from Thursday, March 26 to Saturday, March 28, 2008. After the successful 2007 contest, the scope of the contest expanded to include a wider array of operating systems and browsers. The contest would demonstrate the widespread insecurity of all software in widespread use by consumers. Dragos refined the contest with the help of a wide panel of industry experts and the contest was administered by ZDI, who would again offer to purchase the vulnerabilities after their demonstration. As with all the vulnerabilities that ZDI purchases, the details of the vulnerabilities used in Pwn2Own would be provided to the affected vendors and public details would be withheld until a patch was made available. All contestants who successfully demonstrated exploits at the contest could sell their vulnerabilities to ZDI for prizes of $20,000 on the first day, $10,000 on the second day, and $5,000 on the third day. As in the previous year's contest, only certain attacks were allowed on each day. Targets included three laptops running the default installation of Windows Vista Ultimate SP1, Mac OS X 10.5.2, or Ubuntu Linux 7.10. Day 1 saw remote attacks only; contestants had to join the same network as the target laptop and perform their attack without user interaction and without authentication. Day 2 had browser and Instant messaging attacks included, as well as malicious website attacks with links sent to organizers to be clicked. Day 3 had third-party client applications included. Contestants could target popular third-party software such as browsers, Adobe Flash, Java, Apple Mail, iChat, Skype, AOL, and Microsoft Silverlight.

The laptop running OS X was exploited on the second day of the contest with an exploit for the Safari browser co-written by Charlie Miller, Jake Honoroff and Mark Daniel of Independent Security Evaluators. Their exploit targeted an open-source subcomponent of the Safari browser. The laptop running Windows Vista SP1 was exploited on the third day of the contest with an exploit for Adobe Flash co-written by Shane Macaulay, Alexander Sotirov, and Derek Callaway. After the contest, Adobe disclosed that they had co-discovered the same vulnerability internally and had been working on a patch at the time of Pwn2Own. The laptop running Ubuntu was not exploited.

=== 2009 ===
Pwn2Own 2009 took place over the three days of CanSecWest from Thursday, March 18 to Saturday, March 20, 2009. After having considerably more success targeting web browsers than any other category of software in 2007, the third Pwn2Own focused on popular browsers used on consumer desktop operating systems. It added another category of mobile devices which contestants were challenged to hack via many remote attack vectors including email, SMS messages, and website browsing. All contestants who demonstrated successful exploits at the contest were offered rewards for the underlying vulnerabilities by ZDI, $5,000 for browser exploits and $10,000 for mobile exploits.

Web browser targets were Internet Explorer 8, Firefox, and Chrome installed on a Sony Vaio running Windows 7 Beta and Safari and Firefox installed on a MacBook running Mac OS X. All browsers were fully patched and in default configurations on the first day of the contest. As in previous years, the attack surface contest expanded over the three days. On day 1, contestants had to target functionality in the default browser without access to any plugins. On day 2, Adobe Flash, Java, Microsoft .NET Framework, and QuickTime were included. On day 3, other popular third-party plugins were included like Adobe Reader. Multiple winners per target were allowed, but only the first contestant to exploit each laptop would get it. Mobile device targets included BlackBerry, Android, Apple iPhone 2.0 (T-Mobile G1), Symbian (Nokia N95) and Windows Mobile (HTC Touch) phones in their default configurations.

As with the browser contest, the attack surface available to contestants expanded over three days. In order to prove that they were able to successfully compromise the device, contestants had to demonstrate they could collect sensitive data from the mobile device or incur some type of financial loss from the mobile device owner. On day 1, the device could receive SMS, MMS, and e-mail but messages could not be read. Wifi (if on by default), Bluetooth (if on by default), and radio stack were also in-scope. On day 2, SMS, MMS, and e-mail could be opened and read. Wifi was turned on and Bluetooth could be turned on and paired with a nearby headset (additional pairing disallowed). Day 3 allowed one level of user interaction with the default applications. Multiple winners per device were allowed, but only the first contestant to exploit each mobile device would get it (along with a one-year phone contract).

Based on the increased interest in competing in 2009, ZDI arranged a random selection to determine which team went first against each target. The first contestant to be selected was Charlie Miller. He exploited Safari on OS X without the aid of any browser plugins. In interviews after winning the contest, Miller stressed that while it only took him minutes to run his exploit against Safari it took him many days to research and develop the exploit he used. A researcher identified only as Nils was selected to go after Miller. Nils successfully ran an exploit against Internet Explorer 8 on Windows 7 Beta. In writing this exploit, Nils had to bypass anti-exploitation mitigations that Microsoft had implemented in Internet Explorer 8 and Windows 7, including Data Execution Protection (DEP) and Address Space Layout Randomization (ASLR). Nils continued trying the other browsers. Although Miller had already exploited Safari on OS X, Nils exploited this platform again, then moved on to exploit Firefox successfully. Near the end of the first day, Julien Tinnes and Sami Koivu (remote) successfully exploited Firefox and Safari on OS X with a vulnerability in Java. At the time, OS X had Java enabled by default, which allowed for reliable exploitation against that platform. However, due to having reported the vulnerabilities to the vendor already, Tinnes' participation fell outside the rules of the contest and was unable to be rewarded. The next days of the contest did not attract any additional contestants. Chrome, as well as all of the mobile devices, went unexploited in Pwn2Own 2009.

=== 2010 ===
The competition started on March 24, 2010, and had a total cash prize pool of US$100,000. Nine days before the contest was to begin, Apple released sixteen patches for WebKit and Safari. Concerning software to exploit, $40,000 of the $100,000 was reserved for web browsers, where each target is worth $10,000. Day 1 included Microsoft Internet Explorer 8 on Windows 7, Mozilla Firefox 3.6 on Windows 7, Google Chrome 4 on Windows 7, and Apple Safari 4 on Mac OS X Snow Leopard. Day 2 included Microsoft Internet Explorer 8 on Windows Vista, Mozilla Firefox 3 on Windows Vista, Google Chrome 4 on Windows Vista, and Apple Safari 4 on Mac OS X Snow Leopard. Day 3 included Microsoft Internet Explorer 8 on Windows XP, Mozilla Firefox 3 on Windows XP, Google Chrome 4 on Windows XP, and Apple Safari 4 on Mac OS X Snow Leopard. $60,000 of the total $100,000 cash prize pool was allotted to the mobile phone portion of the contest, each target was worth $15,000. These included Apple iPhone 3GS, RIM BlackBerry Bold 9700, Nokia E72 device running Symbian, and HTC Nexus One running Android.

The Opera web browser was left out of the contests as a target: The ZDI team argued that Opera had a low market share and that Chrome and Safari are only included "due to their default presence on various mobile platforms". However, Opera's rendering engine, Presto, is present on millions of mobile platforms.

Among successful exploits were when Charlie Miller hacked Safari 4 on Mac OS X. Nils hacked Firefox 3.6 on Windows 7 64-bit by using a memory corruption vulnerability and bypassing ASLR and DEP, after which Mozilla patched the security flaw in Firefox 3.6.3. Ralf-Philipp Weinmann and Vincenzo Iozzo hacked the iPhone 3GS by bypassing the digital code signatures used on the iPhone to verify that the code in memory is from Apple. Peter Vreugdenhil exploited Internet Explorer 8 on Windows 7 by using two vulnerabilities that involved bypassing ASLR and evading DEP.

=== 2011 ===
The 2011 contest took place March 9 to 11 during the CanSecWest conference in Vancouver. The web browser targets for the 2011 contest included Microsoft Internet Explorer, Apple Safari, Mozilla Firefox, and Google Chrome. New to the Pwn2Own contest was the fact that a new attack surface was allowed for penetrating mobile phones, specifically over cellphone basebands. The mobile phone targets were Dell Venue Pro running Windows Phone 7, iPhone 4 running iOS, BlackBerry Torch 9800 running BlackBerry OS 6.0, and Nexus S running Android 2.3. Several teams registered for the desktop browser contest. For Apple Safari, registered competitors included VUPEN, Anon_07, Team Anon, Charlie Miller. Mozilla Firefox included Sam Thomas and Anonymous_1. Microsoft Internet Explorer teams included Stephen Fewer, VUPEN, Sam Thomas, and Ahmed M Sleet. Google Chrome teams included Moatz Khader, Team Anon, and Ahmed M Sleet. For the mobile browser category, the following teams registered. For the Apple iPhone hack attempt, teams included Anon_07, Dion Blazakis and Charlie Miller, Team Anon, Anonymous_1, and Ahmed M Sleet. To hack the RIM Blackberry the teams were Anonymous_1, Team Anon, and Ahmed M Sleet. To hack the Samsung Nexus S, teams included Jon Oberheide, Anonymous_1, Anon_07, and Team Anonymous. To hack the Dell Venue Pro, teams included George Hotz, Team Anonymous, Anonymous_1, and Ahmed M Sleet.

During the first day of the competition, Safari and Internet Explorer were defeated by researchers. Safari was version 5.0.3 installed on a fully patched Mac OS X 10.6.6. French security firm VUPEN was the first to attack the browser. Internet Explorer was a 32-bit version 8 installed on 64-bit Windows 7 Service Pack 1. Security researcher Stephen Fewer of Harmony Security was successful in exploiting IE. This was demonstrated just as with Safari. In day 2 the iPhone 4 and Blackberry Torch 9800 were both exploited. The iPhone was running iOS 4.2.1; however, the flaw exists in version 4.3 of the iOS. Security researchers Charlie Miller and Dion Blazakis were able to gain access to the iPhone's address book through a vulnerability in Mobile Safari by visiting their exploit-ridden webpage. The Blackberry Torch 9800 phone was running BlackBerry OS 6.0.0.246. The team of Vincenzo Iozzo, Willem Pinckaers, and Ralf Philipp Weinmann took advantage of a vulnerability in the Blackberry's WebKit-based web browser by visiting their previously prepared webpage. Firefox, Android, and Windows Phone 7 were scheduled to be tested during day 2, but the security researchers that had been chosen for these platforms did not attempt any exploits. Sam Thomas had been selected to test Firefox, but he withdrew stating that his exploit was not stable. The researchers that had been chosen to test Android and Windows Phone 7 did not show up. No teams showed up for day three. Chrome and Firefox were not hacked.

=== 2012 ===
For 2012 the rules were changed to a capture-the-flag-style competition with a point system. The new format caused Charlie Miller, successful at the event in past years, to decide not to attend, as it required "on-the-spot" writing of exploits that Miller argued favored larger teams. Hackers went against the four major browsers.

At Pwn2Own 2012, Chrome was successfully exploited for the first time. VUPEN declined to reveal how they escaped the sandbox, saying they would sell the information. Internet Explorer 9 on Windows 7 was successfully exploited next. Firefox was the third browser to be hacked using a zero day exploit.

Safari on Mac OS X Lion was the only browser left standing at the conclusion of the zero-day portion of Pwn2Own. Versions of Safari that were not fully patched and running on Mac OS X Snow Leopard were compromised during the CVE portion of Pwn2Own. Significant improvements in the security mitigations within Mac OS X were introduced in Lion.

==== Controversy with Google ====
Google withdrew from sponsorship of the event because the 2012 rules did not require full disclosure of exploits from winners, specifically exploits to break out of a sandboxed environment and demonstrated exploits that did not "win". Pwn2Own defended the decision, saying that it believed that no hackers would attempt to exploit Chrome if their methods had to be disclosed. Google offered a separate "Pwnium" contest that offered up to $60,000 for Chrome-specific exploits. Non-Chrome vulnerabilities used were guaranteed to be immediately reported to the appropriate vendor. Sergey Glazunov and a teenager identified as "PinkiePie" each earned $60,000 for exploits that bypassed the security sandbox. Google issued a fix to Chrome users in less than 24 hours after the Pwnium exploits were demonstrated.

=== 2013 ===
In 2013, Google returned as a sponsor and the rules were changed to require full disclosure of exploits and techniques used. The Mobile Pwn2Own 2013 contest was held November 13–14, 2013, during the PacSec 2013 Conference in Tokyo. Web browsers Google Chrome, Internet Explorer and Firefox, along with Windows 8 and Java, were exploited. Adobe also joined the contest, adding Reader and Flash. Apple Safari on Mountain Lion was not targeted as no teams showed up.

French security firm VUPEN has successfully exploited a fully updated Internet Explorer 10 on Microsoft Surface Pro running a 64-bit version of Windows 8 and fully bypassed Protected Mode sandbox without crashing or freezing the browser. The VUPEN team then exploited Mozilla Firefox, Adobe Flash, and Oracle Java. Pinkie Pie won $50,000, and Google released Chrome updates on November 14 to address the vulnerabilities exploited. Nils and Jon from MWRLabs were successful at exploiting Google Chrome using WebKit and Windows kernel flaws to bypass Chrome sandbox and won $100,000. George Hotz exploited Adobe Acrobat Reader and escaped the sandbox to win $70,000. James Forshaw, Joshua Drake, and Ben Murphy independently exploited Oracle Java to win $20,000 each.

The mobile contest saw contestants winning $117,500 out of a prize pool of $300,000.

=== 2014 ===
At Pwn2Own 2014 in March was held in Vancouver at the CanSecWest Conference and sponsored by Hewlett-Packard. All four targeted browsers fell to researchers, and contestants overall won $850,000 of an available pool of $1,085,000. VUPEN successfully exploited fully updated Internet Explorer 11, Adobe Reader XI, Google Chrome, Adobe Flash, and Mozilla Firefox on a 64-bit version of Windows 8.1, to win a total of $400,000—the highest payout to a single competitor to date. The company used a total of 11 distinct zero-day vulnerabilities.

Among other successful exploits in 2014, Internet Explorer 11 was exploited by Sebastian Apelt and Andreas Schmidt for a prize of $100,000. Apple Safari on Mac OS X Mavericks and Adobe Flash on Windows 8.1 were successfully exploited by Liang Chen of Keen Team and Zeguang Zhao of team509. Mozilla Firefox was exploited three times on the first day, and once more on the second day, with HP awarding researchers $50,000 for each disclosed Firefox flaw that year. Both Vupen and an anonymous participant exploited Google Chrome. Vupen earned $100,000 for the crack, while the anonymous entrant had their prize of $60,000 reduced, as their attack relied on a vulnerability revealed the day before at Google's Pwnium contest. Also, Nico Joly of the VUPEN team took on the Windows Phone (the Lumia 1520), but was unable to gain full control of the system. In 2014, Keen Lab hacked Windows 8.1 Adobe Flash in 16 seconds, as well as the OSX Mavericks Safari system in 20 seconds.

=== 2015–2017 ===
Every single prize available was claimed in 2015 in March in Vancouver, and all browsers were hacked for a total in $557,500 and other prizes. The top hacker proved to be Jung Hoon Lee, who took out "IE 11, both the stable and beta versions of Google Chrome, and Apple Safari" and earned $225,000 in prize money. Other hacks included Team509 and KeenTeem breaking into Adobe Flash, and other breaks in Adobe Reader. Overall, there were 5 bugs in the Windows operating system, 4 in Internet Explorer 11, 3 in Firefox, Adobe Reader, and Adobe Flash, 2 in Safari, and 1 in Chrome. Google ceased to be a sponsor of Pwn2Own in 2015.

At the contest in March 2016, "each of the winning entries was able to avoid the sandboxing mitigations by leveraging vulnerabilities in the underlying OSs." In 2016, Chrome, Microsoft Edge and Safari were all hacked. According to Brian Gorenc, manager of Vulnerability Research at HPE, they had chosen not to include Firefox that year as they had "wanted to focus on the browsers that [had] made serious security improvements in the last year". After two days of competition, Tencent Security Team Sniper edged out JungHoon Lee with 13 more Pwn points and earning them the top Master of Pwn for Pwn2Own 2016 title. In Mobile Pwn2Own 2016, which was held in tandem with the PacSecWest security conference in Tokyo, Tencent Team Keen won $215k at Mobile Pwn2Own 2016, by attacking Nexus6P and two exploits for the iPhone iOS 10.1, and was named Master of Pwn, a title ZDI gives to the contestant that accumulates the most points throughout the contest.

In March 2017 in Vancouver, for the first time hackers broke into VMWare's virtual machine sandbox. In 2017, Chrome did not have any successful hacks (although only one team attempted to target Chrome); the subsequent browsers that best fared were, in order, Firefox, Safari and Edge. Mobile Pwn2Own was held on November 1 and 2 in 2017. Representatives from Apple, Google and Huawei were at the contest. Various smartphones, including ones using Apple's iOS 11.1 software, were also successfully hacked. The "11 successful attacks" were against the iPhone 7, the Huawei Mate 9 Pro and the Samsung Galaxy S8. Google Pixel was not hacked. Overall, ZDI that year awarded $833,000 to uncover 51 zero-day bugs. The team Qihoo 360 won the top prize in 2017.

=== 2018 ===
In 2018, the conference was much smaller and sponsored primarily by Microsoft. China had banned its security researchers from participating in the contest, despite Chinese nationals winning in the past, and banned divulging security vulnerabilities to foreigners. In particular, Tencent's Keen Labs and Qihoo 360's 360Vulcan teem did not enter, nor any other Chinese nationals. A Tianfu Cup was subsequently designed to be a "Chinese version of Pwn2Own", also taking place twice a year. Also, shortly before the 2018 conference, Microsoft had patched several vulnerabilities in Edge, causing many teams to withdraw. Nevertheless, certain openings were found in Edge, Safari, Firefox and more. No hack attempts were made against Chrome, although the reward offered was the same as for Edge. Hackers were ultimately awarded $267,000. While many Microsoft products had large rewards available to anyone who was able to gain access through them, only Edge was successfully exploited, and also Safari and Firefox.

=== 2019 ===
A March 2019 contest took place in Vancouver at the CanSecWest conference, with categories including VMware ESXi, VMware Workstation, Oracle VirtualBox, Chrome, Microsoft Edge, and Firefox, as well as Tesla. Tesla entered its new Model 3 sedan, with a pair of researchers earning $375,000 and the car they hacked after finding a severe memory randomization bug in the car's infotainment system. It was also the first year that hacking of devices in the home automation category was allowed.

In October 2019, Politico reported that the next edition of Pwn2Own had added industrial control systems. Pwn2Own Tokyo was held November 6 to November 7, and was expected to hand out $750,000 in cash and prizes. Facebook Portal was entered, as was the Amazon Echo Show 5, a Google Nest Hub Max, an Amazon Cloud Cam and a Nest Cam IQ Indoor. Also entered was the Oculus Quest virtual reality kit. In 2019, a team won $60,000 hacking into an Amazon Echo Show 5. They did so by hacking into the "patch gap" that meshed older software patched onto other platforms, as the smart screen used an old version of Chromium. The team shared the findings with Amazon, which said it was investigating the hack and would take "appropriate steps."

=== 2020 ===
A new edition of the Pwn2Own contest took place on January 21–23, 2020, in Miami at the S4 conference, with industrial control system and SCADA targets only. Contestants were awarded more than $250,000 over the three-day event as hackers demonstrated a multiple exploits in many leading ICS platforms. Steven Seeley and Chris Anastasio, a hacker duo calling themselves Team Incite, were awarded the title of Master of Pwn with winnings of $80,000 and 92.5 Master of Pwn points. Overall, the contest had 14 winning demonstrations, nine partial wins due to bug collisions, and two failed entries.

The spring edition of Pwn2Own 2020 occurred on March 18–19, 2020. Tesla again returned as a sponsor and had a Model 3 as an available target. Due to COVID-19, the conference moved to a virtual event. The Zero Day Initiative decided to allow remote participation. This allowed researchers to send their exploits to the program prior to the event. ZDI researchers then ran the exploits from their homes and recorded the screen as well as the Zoom call with the contestant. The contest saw six successful demonstrations and awarded $270,000 over the two-day event while purchasing 13 unique bugs in Adobe Reader, Apple Safari and macOS, Microsoft Windows, and Oracle VirtualBox. The duo of Amat Cama and Richard Zhu (Team Fluoroacetate) was crowned Master of Pwn with earnings of $90,000.

The fall edition on Pwn2Own, normally referred to as Pwn2Own Tokyo, was held on November 5–7, 2020. With the lockdown from COVID-19 continuing, the contest was again held virtually and titled Pwn2Own Tokyo (Live From Toronto). ZDI researchers in Toronto ran the event, with others connecting from home. The event had eight winning entries, nine partial wins due to bug collisions, and two failed attempts. Prizes totalling $136,500 were awarded for 23 unique bugs. The Flashback Team (Pedro Ribeiro and Radek Domanski) earned the Master of Pwn title for their Wide Area Network (WAN) router exploits.

=== 2021 ===
On April 6–8, 2021, the Pwn2Own contest took place in Austin and virtually. This year's event expanded by adding the Enterprise Communications category, which includes Microsoft Teams and Zoom Messenger. The first day of the contest saw Apple Safari, Microsoft Exchange, Microsoft Teams, Windows 10, and Ubuntu all compromised. Zoom Messenger was compromised on the second day of the contest with a zero-click exploit. Parallels Desktop, Google Chrome, and Microsoft Edge were also successfully exploited during the contest. Over US$1,200,000 was awarded for 23 unique 0-days. Master of Pwn was a three-way tie between Team DEVCORE, OV, and the team of Daan Keuper and Thijs Alkemade.

=== 2022 ===
==== Miami (April 19–21) ====
The second edition of Pwn2Own Miami occurred April 19–21, 2022, at the Filmore in South Beach Miami. $400,000 in prize money was awarded. The team of Daan Keuper and Thijs Alkemade from Computest Sector 7 were awarded Master of Pwn with earnings of $90,000.

==== Vancouver (May 18–20) ====
Pwn2Own returned to Vancouver on May 18–20, 2022, to celebrate the 15th anniversary of the contest. Over the three-day event, the ZDI awarded US$1,155,000 for 25 unique 0-day vulnerabilities. Day One of the contest set a single-day contest record of US$800,000 awarded for various exploits, including three separate Microsoft Teams demonstrations. One of these exploits required no user interaction and could be used to compromise an entire organization. Also demonstrated were successful demonstrations against the Mozilla Firefox and Apple Safari web browsers. Day Two of the contest was highlighted by a remote exploit of the Tesla Infotainment system. Researchers from the Synacktiv Team were able to remotely start the windshield wipers, open the trunk, and flash the headlights of the vehicle. The event's final day saw three of the six Windows 11 privilege escalations successfully demonstrated. All six of these exploits used unique bugs. Samsung's flagship phone, the Galaxy S22, running the latest Android 13, was hacked in less than a minute. Once all the points were totaled, the STAR Labs team was awarded the title of Master of Pwn with $270,000 and 27 points.

==== Toronto (December 6–9) ====
Day 1 attempts
Team	Category	Target	Results	References
Nettitude	Printer	Canon imageCLASS MF743Cdw	Success $20K and 2 Master of Pwn	
Qrious Secure	Router (WAN)	TP-Link AX1800	Success $20K and 2 Master of Pwn	
Horizon3 AI	Printer	Lexmark MC3224i	Success $20K and 2 Master of Pwn	
Gaurav Baruah	Router (WAN)	Synology RT6600ax	Success $20K and 2 Master of Pwn	
Interrupt Labs	Printer	HP Color LaserJet Pro M479fdw	Success $20K and 2 Master of Pwn	
STAR Labs	Mobile Phone	Samsung Galaxy S22	Success $50K and 5 Master of Pwn	
Quarkslab	Router (LAN)	NETGEAR RAX30 AX2400	Withdrawn -0.5 Master of Pwn	
Computest	Router (LAN)	Synology RT6600ax	Success $5K and 1 Master of Pwn	
PHPHooligans	Small Office / Home Office (SOHO) Smash-up	NETGEAR RAX30 AX2400	Failure	
PHPHooligans	Small Office / Home Office (SOHO) Smash-up	Lexmark MC3224i	Failure	
Chim	Mobile Phone	Samsung Galaxy S22	Success $25K and 5 Master of Pwn	
Interrupt Labs	Router (LAN)	NETGEAR RAX30 AX2400	Success $5K and 1 Master of Pwn	
Tenable	Router (LAN)	TP-Link AX1800	Failure	
DEVCORE	Small Office / Home Office (SOHO) Smash-up	Mikrotik RouterBoard RB2011UiAS-IN	Success $100K and 10 Master of Pwn	
DEVCORE	Small Office / Home Office (SOHO) Smash-up	Canon imageCLASS MF743Cdw	Success $100K and 10 Master of Pwn	
Claroty Research	Network Attached Storage (NAS)	Synology DiskStation DS920+	Success $40K and 4 Master of Pwn	
NCC Group EDG	Router (LAN)	TP-Link AX1800	Withdrawn -0.5 Master of Pwn	
Team Viettel	Printer	HP Color LaserJet Pro M479fdw	Success $10K and 2 Master of Pwn	
ASU SEFCOM	Network Attached Storage (NAS)	Synology DiskStation DS920+	Collision $10K and 2 Master of Pwn	
Claroty Research	Router (LAN)	NETGEAR RAX30 AX2400	Success $2.5K and 1 Master of Pwn	
NCC Group EDG	Router (LAN)	Synology RT6600ax	Collision $1250 and 0.5 Master of Pwn	
Neodyme	Small Office / Home Office (SOHO) Smash-up	NETGEAR RAX30 AX2400	Success $50K and 10 Master of Pwn	
Neodyme	Small Office / Home Office (SOHO) Smash-up	HP Color LaserJet Pro M479fdw	Success $50K and 10 Master of Pwn	
Qrious Secure	Router (LAN)	NETGEAR RAX30 AX2400	Collision $1250 and 0.5 Master of Pwn	

Day 2 attempts
Team	Category	Target	Results	References
ANHTUD Information Security Department	Printer	HP Color LaserJet Pro M479fdw	Success $10K and 2 Master of Pwn	
PHPHooligans	Router (WAN)	NETGEAR RAX30 AX2400	Collision $10K and 1 Master of Pwn	
Bugscale	Small Office / Home Office (SOHO) Smash-up	Synology RT6600ax	Success and Collision $37.5K and 7.5 Master of Pwn	
Bugscale	Small Office / Home Office (SOHO) Smash-up	HP Color LaserJet Pro M479fdw	Success and Collision $37.5K and 7.5 Master of Pwn	
Qrious Secure	Smart Speaker	Sonos One Speaker	Success $60K and 6 Master of Pwn	
Team Viettel	Router (LAN)	TP-Link AX1800	Success $5K and 1 Master of Pwn	
Le Tran Hai Tung	Printer	Canon imageCLASS MF743Cdw	Success $10K and 2 Master of Pwn	
Synacktiv	Printer	Lexmark MC3224i	Success $10K and 2 Master of Pwn	
STAR Labs	Smart Speaker	Sonos One Speaker	Success and Collision $22.5K and 4.5 Master of Pwn	
Summoning Team	Router (LAN)	Synology RT6600ax	Collision $1250 and 0.5 Master of Pwn points	
NCC Group EDG	Router (LAN)	NETGEAR RAX30 AX2400	Success and Collision $7.5K and 1.5 Master of Pwn	
Team Viettel	Printer	Canon imageCLASS MF743Cdw	Success $10K and 2 Master of Pwn	
NCC Group EDG	Printer	Lexmark MC3224i	Success $10K and 2 Master of Pwn	
Qrious Secure	Small Office / Home Office (SOHO) Smash-up	NETGEAR RAX30 AX2400	Failure	
Qrious Secure	Small Office / Home Office (SOHO) Smash-up	WD My Cloud Pro Series PR4100	Failure	
DEVCORE	Printer	HP Color LaserJet Pro M479fdw	Collision $5K and 1 Master of Pwn	
Ledger Donjon	Router (WAN)	TP-Link AX1800	Withdrawn -1 Master of Pwn	
DEVCORE	Printer	Canon imageCLASS MF743Cdw	Success $10K and 2 Master of Pwn	
Luca MORO	Network Attached Storage (NAS)	WD My Cloud Pro Series PR4100	Success $40K and 4 Master of Pwn	
Interrupt Labs	Mobile Phone	Samsung Galaxy S22	Success $25K and 5 Master of Pwn	
Bugscale	Router (WAN)	NETGEAR RAX30 AX2400	Failure	
Aleksei Stafeev	Printer	Lexmark MC3224i	Success and Collision $7.5K and 1.5 Master of Pwn	

Day 3 attempts
Team	Category	Target	Results	References
Team Viettel	Network Attached Storage (NAS)	WD My Cloud Pro Series PR4100	Success $20K and 4 Master of Pwn	
STAR Labs	Small Office / Home Office (SOHO) Smash-up	Synology RT6600ax	Collision $25K and 5 Master of Pwn	
STAR Labs	Small Office / Home Office (SOHO) Smash-up	Canon imageCLASS MF743Cdw	Collision $25K and 5 Master of Pwn	
Bun Bo Ong Chi	Printer	Canon imageCLASS MF743Cdw	Success $10K and 2 Master of Pwn	
DEVCORE	Smart Speaker	Sonos One Speaker	Success and Collision $22.5K and 4.5 Master of Pwn	
Qrious Secure	Mobile Phone	Samsung Galaxy S22	Failure	
Team Viettel	Small Office / Home Office (SOHO) Smash-up	Cisco Integrated Service Router C921-4P	Success and Collision $37.5K and 7.5 Master of Pwn	
Team Viettel	Small Office / Home Office (SOHO) Smash-up	Canon imageCLASS MF743Cdw	Success and Collision $37.5K and 7.5 Master of Pwn	
Pentest Limited	Network Attached Storage (NAS)	WD My Cloud Pro Series PR4100	Success $20K and 4 Master of Pwn	
Peter Geissler	Printer	Canon imageCLASS MF743Cdw	Collision $5K and 1 Master of Pwn	
Qrious Secure	Router (WAN)	NETGEAR RAX30 AX2400	Success and Collision $8.5K and 1.75 Master of Pwn	
Neodyme	Router (WAN)	NETGEAR RAX30 AX2400	Failure	
Pentest Limited	Mobile Phone	Samsung Galaxy S22	Success $25K and 5 Master of Pwn	
R-SEC	Printer	Canon imageCLASS MF743Cdw	Success $10K and 2 Master of Pwn	
NCC Group EDG	Small Office / Home Office (SOHO) Smash-up	Ubiquiti Networks EdgeRouter X SFP	Success $50K and 10 Master of Pwn	
NCC Group EDG	Small Office / Home Office (SOHO) Smash-up	Lexmark MC3224i	Success $50K and 10 Master of Pwn	
Claroty Research	Network Attached Storage (NAS)	WD My Cloud Pro Series PR4100	Success $20K and 4 Master of Pwn	

Day 4 attempts
Team	Category	Target	Results	References
Quarkslab	Router (WAN)	NETGEAR RAX30 AX2400	Failure	
Peter Geissler	Printer	Lexmark MC3224i	Failure	
NCC Group EDG	Printer	Canon imageCLASS MF743Cdw	Collision $5K and 1 Master of Pwn	
Nettitude	Router (WAN)	NETGEAR RAX30 AX2400	Failure	
Synacktiv	Printer	Canon imageCLASS MF743Cdw	Collision $5K and 1 Master of Pwn	
Chris Anastasio	Printer	Lexmark MC3224i	Success $10K and 1 Master of Pwn	
NCC Group EDG	Router (WAN)	Synology RT6600ax	Collision $5K and 1 Master of Pwn	
ANHTUD Information Security Department	Printer	Canon imageCLASS MF743Cdw	Success $10K and 1 Master of Pwn	
DEVCORE	Printer	Lexmark MC3224i	Collision $5K and 1 Master of Pwn	
Sonar	Router (WAN)	Synology RT6600ax	Collision $5K and 1 Master of Pwn	
namnp	Printer	Canon imageCLASS MF743Cdw	Success $10K and 1 Master of Pwn	

== 2023 - Now ==
Pwn2Own also grew outside web browsers and desktop applications to automotive, cloud-native, container and artificial-intelligence security from 2023. Researchers at Pwn2Own Vancouver 2023 exploited 27 different zero day vulnerabilities, earning $1,035,000 in awards and prizes and the Master of Pwn title with 53 points, $530,000 and a Tesla Model 3! The category for cloud-native and container was added to Pwn2Own Vancouver 2024.

The event paid out $1,132,500 for 29 different zero days with Manfred Paul claiming Master of Pwn with 25 points and $202,500. Pwn2Own Berlin 2025 featured a new category for AI. A total of 28 different zero-day vulnerabilities were identified at the event, seven of which were in the AI category, and $1,078,750 was awarded. STAR Labs SG earned the title of Master of Pwn with 35 points and $320,000.

The awards for Pwn2Own Automotive 2026 took place in Tokyo and this year had a total prize of $1,047,000 for 76 distinct zero days. Fuzzware.io scored 28 points and took home $215,500 for being the Master of Pwn. Pwn2Own Berlin 2026 then went on to award $1,298,250 for 47 different zero-day vulnerabilities, with DEVCORE taking home 50.5 points and $505,000. Along with enterprise, virtualization, operating-system and browser categories, there was also an AI category of target.

== See also ==
- Competitive programming
- White hat (computer security)
- DEF CON
