= Vulnerabilities Equities Process =

The Vulnerabilities Equities Process (VEP) is a process used by the U.S. federal government to determine on a case-by-case basis how it should treat zero-day computer security vulnerabilities: whether to disclose them to the public to help improve general computer security, or to keep them secret for offensive use against the government's adversaries.

The VEP was first developed during the period 2008–2009, but only became public in 2016, when the government released a redacted version of the VEP in response to a FOIA request by the Electronic Frontier Foundation.

Following public pressure for greater transparency in the wake of the Shadow Brokers affair, the U.S. government made a more public disclosure of the VEP process in November 2017.

== Participants ==
According to the VEP plan published in 2017, the Equities Review Board (ERB) is the primary forum for interagency deliberation and determinations concerning the VEP. The ERB meets monthly, but may also be convened sooner if an immediate need arises.

The ERB consists of representatives from the following agencies:

- Office of Management and Budget
- Office of the Director of National Intelligence (including the Intelligence Community-Security Coordination Center)
- United States Department of the Treasury
- United States Department of State
- United States Department of Justice (including the Federal Bureau of Investigation and the National Cyber Investigative Joint Task Force)
- Department of Homeland Security (including the National Cybersecurity and Communications Integration Center and the United States Secret Service)
- United States Department of Energy
- United States Department of Defense (to include the National Security Agency, including Information Assurance and Signals Intelligence elements), United States Cyber Command, and DoD Cyber Crime Center)
- United States Department of Commerce
- Central Intelligence Agency

The National Security Agency serves as the executive secretariat for the VEP.

== Process ==
According to the November 2017 version of the VEP, the process is as follows:

=== Submission and notification ===
When an agency finds a vulnerability, it will notify the VEP secretariat as soon as is possible. The notification will include a description of the vulnerability and the vulnerable products or systems, together with the agency's recommendation to either disseminate or restrict the vulnerability information.

The secretariat will then notify all participants of the submission within one business day, requesting them to respond if they have an relevant interest.

=== Equity and discussions ===
An agency expressing an interest must indicate whether it concurs with the original recommendation to disseminate or restrict within five business days. If it does not, it will hold discussions with the submitting agency and the VEP secretariat within seven business days to attempt to reach consensus. If no consensus is reached, the participants will suggest options for the Equities Review Board.

=== Determination to disseminate or restrict ===
Decisions whether to disclose or restrict a vulnerability should be made quickly, in full consultation with all concerned agencies, and in the overall best interest of the competing interests of the missions of the U.S. government. As far as possible, determinations should be based on rational, objective methodologies, taking into account factors such as prevalence, reliance, and severity.

If the review board members cannot reach consensus, they will vote on a preliminary determination. If an agency with an equity disputes that decision, they may, by providing notice to the VEP secretariat, elect to contest the preliminary determination. If no agency contests a preliminary determination, it will be treated as a final decision.

=== Handling and follow-on actions ===
If vulnerability information is released, this will be done as quickly as possible, preferably within seven business days.

Disclosure of vulnerabilities will be conducted according to guidelines agreed on by all members. The submitting agency is presumed to be most knowledgeable about the vulnerability and, as such, will be responsible for disseminating vulnerability information to the vendor. The submitting agency may elect to delegate dissemination responsibility to another agency on its behalf.

The releasing agency will promptly provide a copy of the disclosed information to the VEP secretariat for record keeping. Additionally, the releasing agency is expected to follow up so the ERB can determine whether the vendor's action meets government requirements. If the vendor chooses not to address a vulnerability, or is not acting with urgency consistent with the risk of the vulnerability, the releasing agency will notify the secretariat, and the government may take other mitigation steps.

== Criticism ==
The VEP process has been criticized for a number of deficiencies, including restriction by non-disclosure agreements, lack of risk ratings, special treatment for the NSA, and less than whole-hearted commitment to disclosure as the default option.

== UK equivalent ==
British intelligence agencies—GCHQ in particular—follow a similar approach, also known as the Equities Process, to determine whether to disclose or retain security vulnerabilities. The Investigatory Powers Act 2016 was amended in 2022 to bring oversight of the operation of the process within the remit of the Investigatory Powers Commissioner. Details of the process were made public in 2018.

== See also ==
- Cyber-arms industry
- Tailored Access Operations
