= Vupen =

Information security company

Vupen Security
- Type: Société anonyme
- Industry: computer programming
- Founded: 2004
- Defunct: May 5, 2015
- Headquarters: Montpellier, France
- Area served: Information security, Espionage
- Website: vupen.com at the Wayback Machine (archived 2014-02-12)

Vupen Security was a French information security company founded in 2004 and based in Montpellier with a U.S. branch based in Annapolis, Maryland. Its specialty was in discovering zero-day vulnerabilities in software from major vendors in order to sell them to law enforcement and intelligence agencies which used them to achieve both defensive and offensive cyber-operations. Vupen ceased trading in 2015, and the founders created a new company Zerodium.

== Work ==
In 2011, 2012, 2013 and 2014 Vupen won first prize in the hacking contest Pwn2Own, most notably in 2012 by exploiting a bug in Google Chrome. Their decision not to reveal the details of the vulnerability to Google, but rather to sell them, was controversial. Unlike in 2012, during Pwn2Own 2014, Vupen decided to reveal to the affected vendors, including Google, all its exploits and technical details regarding the discovered vulnerabilities, which led to the release of various security updates from Adobe, Microsoft, Apple, Mozilla, and Google to address the reported flaws.

Some years ago, Vupen was still providing information about vulnerabilities in software for free but then decided to monetize its services. "The software companies had their chance", said Vupen-founder Chaouki Bekrar according to an article in Die Zeit, "now it's too late". On 15 September 2013, it was revealed that the NSA was a client of Vupen and had a subscription to its exploit service. On 9 November 2014, the German magazine Der Spiegel reported that the German information security agency BSI, tasked with the protection of federal government networks, was also a client of Vupen. On 22 July 2015, it was revealed that Vupen provided exploits to the Italian company Hacking Team between 2010 and 2011.

On 5 May 2015, Vupen's founders filed documents to close the company and moved to the US to start a new cybersecurity startup named Zerodium.

== Zerodium ==
On 23 July 2015, Vupen's founders launched their new cybersecurity company Zerodium in the US. The company has a different business model as it acquires zero-day capabilities from independent researchers and reports them, along with protective measures and security recommendations, to its government clients.
