= Alisa Esage =

Russian computer security researcher (born 1984)

- Born: Алиса Шевченко; 19.05 1984 (age 41–42); Russia
- Other name: Alisa Shevchenko
- Occupation: Cybersecurity researcher
- Organization: Zero Day Engineering
- Website: Homepage

Alisa Shevchenko (Russian: Алиса Андреевна Шевченко), professionally known as Alisa Esage, is a Russian-born computer security researcher, entrepreneur and hacker. She is known for working independently with dominant software corporations such as Google and Microsoft to find and exploit security weaknesses in their products; being the first female participant in Pwn2Own, the world's premiere professional hacking competition with significant cash prizes; and being accused by the government of the United States of hacking the presidential elections in 2016.

Alisa Esage is the owner of Zero Day Engineering, an expert firm offering specialized training and consulting in software vulnerability research.

== Biography ==
A self-described "offensive security researcher," a 2014 profile in Forbes says of Esage: "she was more drawn to hacking than programming." After dropping out of university she worked as a malware analysis expert for Kaspersky Labs for five years. In 2009, she founded the company Esage Labs, later known as ZOR Security (the Russian acronym stands for Цифровое Оружие и Защита, "Digital Weapons and Defense.")

Esage's company ZOR Security was placed on a list of US sanctioned entities after being accused of "helping Vladimir Putin bid to swing the [2016] election for Trump". Regarding White House accusations, Esage stated that authorities either misinterpreted facts or were deceived. To this day, U.S. officials have not said why they believe Esage worked with the GRU's hackers, or what she allegedly gave them.

In early 2021, Esage announced the Zero Day Engineering project, specialized on professional training, research intelligence, and consulting in the area of advanced computer security and vulnerability research.

Esage has won several international advanced hacking competitions, spoke at multiple international security conferences, and published technical articles in top-tier technical magazines. Esage is part Ukrainian.

== Achievements ==
In 2014 Esage took the first place in the PHDays IV "Critical Infrastructure Attack" contest (alternative name: "Hack the Smart City"), successfully hacking a mock-up smart city and detecting several zero-day vulnerabilities in Indusoft Web Studio 7.1 by Schneider Electric.

In 2014-2018 Esage was credited for discovering multiple zero-day security vulnerabilities in popular software products from tech giants such as Microsoft, Firefox, and Google. Part of those vulnerabilities were responsively disclosed via the Zero Day Initiative (ZDI) security bounty program, previously owned by U.S. tech giant HP, and credited under various pseudonyms.

Esage has presented her research at multiple international security conferences: RECON, Positive Hack Days, Zero Nights, POC x Zer0con, Chaos Communications Congress.

Her work has been featured in various professional security industry publications such as Virus Bulletin, Secure List, and Phrack Magazine.

=== Pwn2Own ===
On 8 April 2021 Esage was the first woman to win in the Pwn2Own, the advanced hacking competition running since 2007. As part of her competition entry at Pwn2Own Vancouver 2021 Esage targeted Parallels Desktop for Mac version 16.1.3 with a zero day exploit developed by herself, and was able to demonstrate a guest-to-host virtual machine escape with arbitrary code execution on MacOS, on a fully patched system. The entry was declared a partial win by the contest due to the fact that the targeted software vendor knew internally about the zero day bug that was leveraged in Esage's exploit.

== Controversy ==
The "partial win" naming of Esage's Pwn2Own Vancouver 2021 exploit by the organizers raised controversy in the global information security community, with commenters on Twitter demanding that the rules of the competition be changed so that the attempt could be declared a complete win. According to Pwn2Own rules of 2021, a successful contest entry may be disqualified or downgraded in the competition charts if the targeted software vendor was internally aware of the respective vulnerability (while still unpatched) on the day of the contest. Esage's participation attracted attention to that point of the rules, with numerous arguments tweeted by prominent figures of the computer security community to support a change of rules.

Esage's status as the first woman in Pwn2Own history was also questioned, although to a lesser extent. While the competition livestream recording is clear on that point, with the narrator saying at 05:08 "Alisa is our first ever female participant", and the Pwn2Own founder chiming in on Twitter, the official contest tweet came with a side note: "the first female participating as an individual". This is likely because a team participant in Pwn2Own 2018 of the Ret2 Systems team changed their name and gender identity in the later years. Fact-wise, public record of Pwn2Own competitions in the official blog posts and livestream recordings holds no mentions of female participation prior to Esage's 2021 entry.

== Motivation and personality ==
Esage quotes her father as being the main inspiration to her choice of occupation and career: "He taught me to solder when I was 5 years old, I think. So I started reading books about computers and programming in early school and taught myself to code in C++ and x86 assembly language as soon as I got a PC at age 15."

On her participation in the Pwn2Own competition: "It’s an essential milestone in a professional hacker’s career, and a major goal personally. I am super hyped! And relieved"

== Publications and exploits ==
- Esage, Alisa (6 May 2016). "Self-patching Microsoft XML with misalignments and factorials". Phrack Magazine. 69 (10).
- "Microsoft Windows Media Center CVE-2014-4060 Remote Code Execution Vulnerability". SecurityFocus. 14 August 2014.
- "(0Day) Microsoft Word Line Formatting Denial of Service Vulnerability". Zero Day Initiative. 27 February 2015.
- "Rootkit evolution". Secure List.
- "Case study: the Ibank trojan". Virus Bulletin.
- "Fuzzing everything in 2014 for 0-day vulnerability disclosure". Virus Bulletin, 2014.
- "On cyber investigations. Case study: a money transfer system robbery". Virus Bulletin, 2014.
- "Microsoft Security Bulletin MS14-067 - Critical". March 2023.
- "Microsoft XML Core Services CVE-2014-4118 Remote Code Execution Vulnerability".
- badd1e on GitHub.
