= Mass surveillance industry =

Industry

The mass surveillance industry is a multibillion-dollar industry that has undergone phenomenal growth since 2001. According to data provided by The Wall Street Journal, the retail market for surveillance tools has grown from "nearly zero" in 2001 to about US$5 billion in 2011. The size of the video surveillance market rose to US$13.5 billion in 2012 and is expected to reach US$39 billion by 2020.

== Current developments ==
Fueled by widespread fears of terrorist attacks, the future of surveillance is particularly promising in the field of video content analysis, where computers analyze live camera feeds to count the number of people, register temperature changes, and automatically identify suspicious behavior via statistical algorithms. The following terrorist attacks have led to a significant increase in street-level surveillance:

- Shortly after the 2013 Boston Marathon bombings, police commissioner Edward F. Davis requested the installation of more cameras to boost street-level surveillance. The Mayor of New York City, Michael Bloomberg, said that the bombings are a "terrible reminder" of the importance of acquiring surveillance technology.
- In the aftermath of the 2001 September 11 attacks, U.S. cities spent billions of dollars in federal counter-terrorism funding to deploy video sensors in public areas.

== Private intelligence agencies ==
Private intelligence agencies are non-governmental corporations involved in the collection and analysis of information. Prior to the 9/11 attacks, such tasks were mostly performed by governmental agencies such as the National Security Agency (NSA) and Central Intelligence Agency (CIA). After the 9/11 terrorist attacks, the gathering of intelligence was rapidly outsourced by the U.S. government to private intelligence agencies, which function as independent contractors.

According to The Washington Post, about one in four U.S. intelligence workers are contractors, and over 70 percent of the budget of the United States Intelligence Community is earmarked for payment to private firms. An examination by The Post found that 1,931 private companies work on programs related to intelligence in about 10,000 locations across the United States.

The average annual cost of a contract employee is US$250,000, almost twice that of a federal employee.

=== Stratfor ===
Strategic Forecasting, Inc., more commonly known as Stratfor, is a global intelligence company founded in 1996 in Austin, Texas. It offers information to governments and private clients including Dow Chemical Company, Lockheed Martin, Northrop Grumman, Raytheon, the U.S. Department of Homeland Security, the U.S. Defense Intelligence Agency, and the U.S. Marine Corps.

In 2012–13, over 5 million internal e-mails from Stratfor were released by WikiLeaks.

=== Booz Allen Hamilton ===
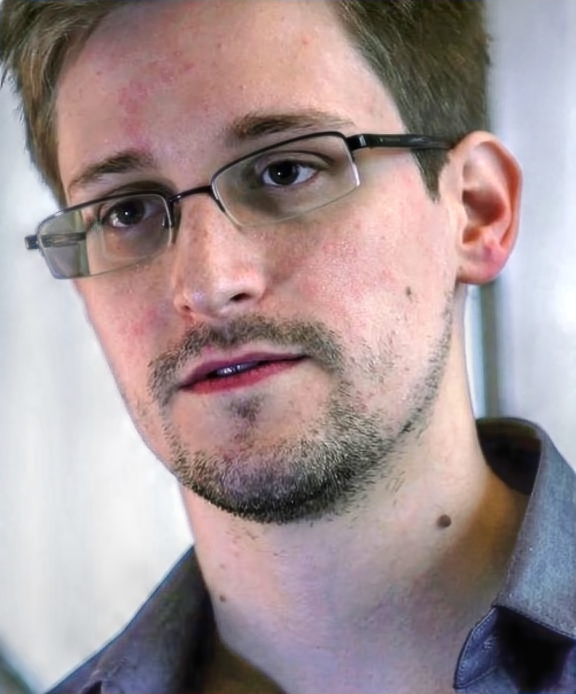
From March to June 2013, Edward Snowden took a pay cut to work at Booz Allen Hamilton so that he could download additional top-secret documents.

Booz Allen Hamilton is a publicly traded company that is majority-owned by The Carlyle Group, a global asset management firm specializing in private equity, based in Washington, D.C. Founded in 1914 by Edwin G. Booz, Booz Allen Hamilton became one of the most profitable private contractors by supplying tens of thousands of intelligence analysts to the U.S. federal government. During the fiscal year of 2013, Booz Allen Hamilton derived 99% of its income from the government, and the largest portion of its revenue (16%) came from the U.S. Army. Half of its employees carry top secret security clearances. In the first half of 2013, Booz Allen Hamilton has won numerous contracts, including:

- A US $95 million contract with the Space and Naval Warfare Systems Command
- A US $102 million contract with the Department of Transportation
- A US $315 million contract with the National Geospatial-Intelligence Agency
- A US $900 million contract to strengthen cybersecurity
- A US $5.6 billion contract with the Defense Intelligence Agency
- A US $6 billion contract, shared with other companies, to develop a shopping hub for federal agencies looking to shield their computer networks from hackers.

In 2006, Booz Allen Hamilton was recognized by Fortune magazine as one of the "100 Best Companies to Work For". In 2013, Booz Allen Hamilton was hailed by Bloomberg Businessweek as "the World's Most Profitable Spy Organization".

== Controversy ==
Commercial mass surveillance often makes use of copyright laws and "user agreements" to obtain (typically uninformed) 'consent' to surveillance from consumers who use their software or other related materials. This allows the gathering of information that would be technically illegal if performed by government agencies. This data is then often shared with government agencies - thereby - in practice - defeating the purpose of such privacy protections.

Reporters Without Borders' March 2013 Special report on Internet Surveillance contained a list of "Corporate Enemies of the Internet", companies that sell products that are liable to be used by governments to violate human rights and freedom of information. The five companies on the initial list were: Amesys (France), Blue Coat Systems (U.S.), Gamma (UK and Germany), Hacking Team (Italy), and Trovicor (Germany), but the list was not exhaustive and is likely to be expanded in the future.

== See also ==
- Cyber-arms industry – Markets involving the sale of software exploits
- Data broker – Data collector and vendor to third parties
- Indiscriminate monitoring – Mass monitoring of individuals or groups without selectivity
- Surveillance capitalism – Concept in political economics
- Market for zero-day exploits – Trafficking of undiscovered software exploits
