= Surveillance tools =

Surveillance tools are all means of technology provided and used by the surveillance industry, police or military intelligence, and national security institutions that enable individual surveillance and mass surveillance.

The following components are used for surveillance, some of which were originally cited by Steven Ashley in Scientific American:

- Primarily electronic
  - Digital still and video cameras (CCTVs)
  - GPSs for tracking
  - Electronic toll collection
  - Computer and network surveillance
  - Phone tapping
  - Cell phone monitoring
  - Voice recognition, facial recognition, walking gait analysis and other biometric characteristics
  - Covert listening devices or "bugs", tiny, hidden microphone and short-range radio transmitter
  - Directional microphones
  - Smart glasses, and other wearable technologies
- Primarily chemical
  - Artificial noses
  - Chemical markers like UV markers
  - DNA sensors: Biochip etc., for screening tiniest traces of body material
- Other
  - Airplanes, unmanned aerial vehicles and satellites
  - Night-vision goggles or telescopes
  - Laser beam bounced off a window to record vibrations in the pane from conversations in the room
  - Discarded items containing personal information, like
    - phone bills,
    - credit-card statements and
    - computer hard drives (using digital forensics)

The electronic means, especially when combined with Internet features (ubiquitous computing, IoT) and enhanced by artificial intelligence analysis methods readily lend themselves to mass surveillance. This is why countersurveillance measures like anonymization and end-to-end encryption have become critical. Devices like chemical markers, on the other hand are more suited and in fact designed mainly for monitoring individuals.

== See also ==
- Global surveillance disclosures (2013–present)
- List of government mass surveillance projects
- National Applications Office
- Surveillance Detection Unit
