= Zone-H =

Archive of defaced websites

- Website type: Website defacement archive, Cybersecurity
- Owner: Roberto Preatoni
- Creator: Roberto Preatoni
- Website: www.zone-h.org
- Commercial: No
- Registration: Optional
- Launched: March 2, 2002
- Current status: Active

Zone-H is an online archive dedicated to collecting and publishing records of defaced websites. Founded on March 2, 2002, and based in Estonia, the platform has become a widely recognized database for tracking defacements and incidents of cyber vandalism. A WHOIS lookup shows the domain was created on February 14, 2002.

== Overview ==
Zone-H serves as a repository where defaced websites are mirrored and stored. Once submitted either by third parties or the attackers themselves each defacement is subject to moderation to verify authenticity. If approved, the mirrored defacement is permanently archived for public reference.

Aside from its archive functionality, Zone-H also operates as a cybersecurity news portal, offering original content related to:

- IT security developments
- Digital warfare
- Geopolitical implications of cyber attacks
- Advisories and technical analyses
- Research articles and community forums

The platform publishes content in multiple languages and is especially popular in countries such as Iran and Turkey.

In recent years, Zone-H has faced censorship in certain countries. It was reportedly banned by some Indian ISPs due to legal action initiated by the Government of India.

== See also ==
- WabiSabiLabi – an online vulnerability marketplace also founded by Roberto Preatoni
