= Charlie Miller (security researcher) =

American computer security researcher

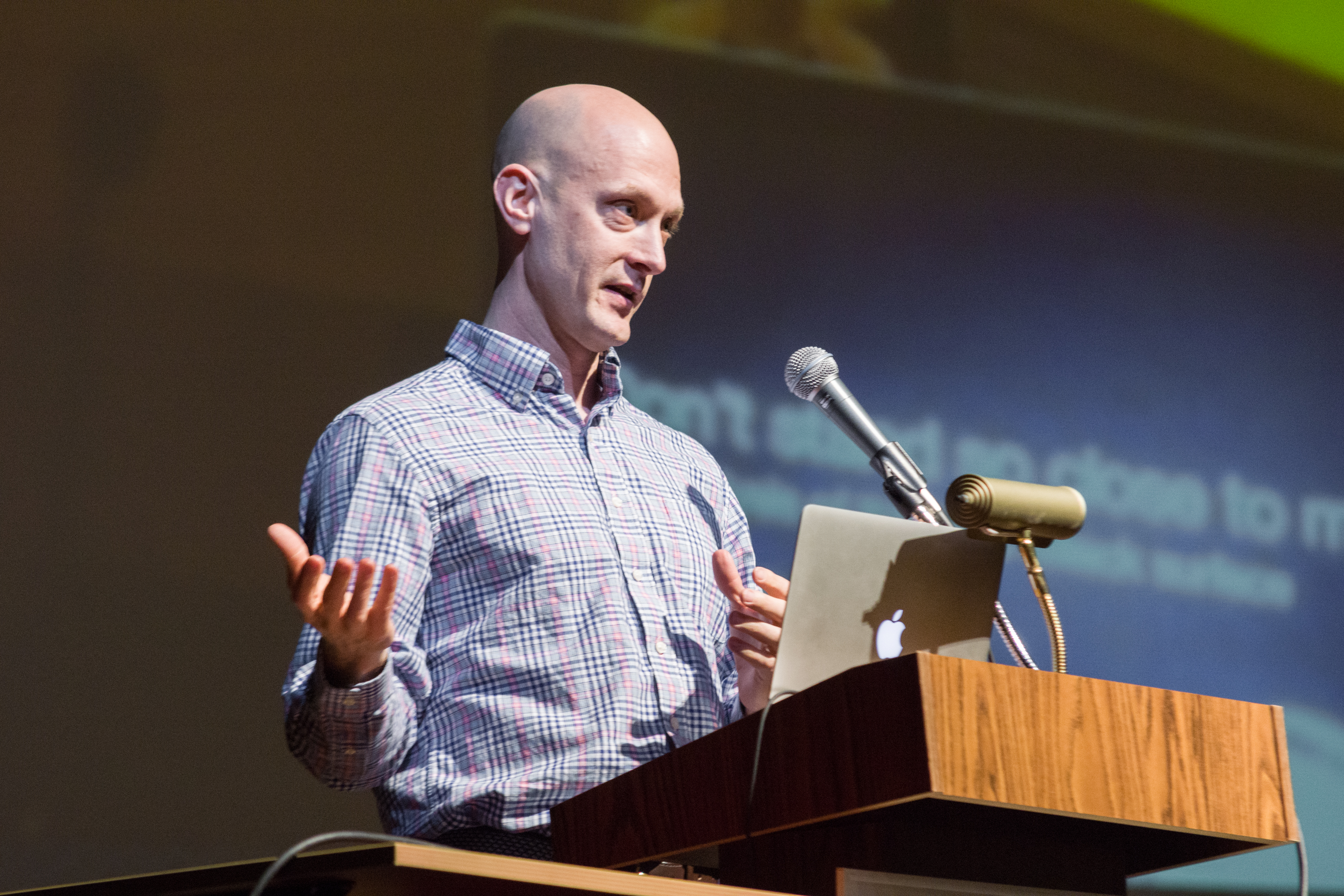
- Miller speaking at Truman State University
- Education: Northeast Missouri State, University of Notre Dame
- Known for: Pwn2Own contest winner
- Scientific career
- Fields: Computer science
- Thesis: New Types of Soliton Solutions in Nonlinear Evolution Equations (2000)
- Doctoral advisor: Mark S. Alber

Charles Alfred Miller is an American computer security researcher with Cruise Automation. Prior to his current employment, he spent five years working for the National Security Agency and has worked for Uber.

== Education ==
Miller holds a bachelor's degree in mathematics with a minor in philosophy from the then called Northeast Missouri State, and a Ph.D. in mathematics from the University of Notre Dame in 2000. He lives in Wildwood, Missouri.

== Security research ==
As of 2007 Miller was a lead analyst at Independent Security Evaluators, a computer protection consultancy. He has publicly demonstrated many security exploits of Apple products.

In 2008, he won a $10,000 cash prize at the hacker conference Pwn2Own in Vancouver, British Columbia, Canada for being the first to find a critical bug in the MacBook Air.

In 2009, he won $5,000 for cracking Apple's Safari browser. Also in 2009, he and Collin Mulliner demonstrated an SMS processing vulnerability that allowed for complete compromise of the Apple iPhone and denial-of-service attacks on other phones. In 2011, he found a security hole in the iPhone and iPad, whereby an application can contact a remote computer to download new unapproved software that can execute any command that could steal personal data or otherwise using iOS applications functions for malicious purposes. As a proof of concept, Miller created an application called Instastock that was approved by Apple's App Store. He then informed Apple about the security hole, who promptly expelled him from the App Store.

Miller participated in research on discovering security vulnerabilities in NFC (Near Field Communication).

== First Apple iPhone exploit ==
Charlie Miller presented about the first iPhone exploit in 2007. He demonstrated a vulnerability in the mobile Safari browser that allowed an attacker to gain control of the iPhone.

== First Google Android exploit ==
Miller, along with his colleagues Mark Daniel and Jake Honoroff at ISE, identified and exploited a security vulnerability in the Android operating system. They found that the vulnerability was due to Google using an older, vulnerable version of the Webkit library utilized by Android.

The initial vulnerability was discovered and an exploit developed using the Android SDK and emulator.

It is rumored that Miller acquired a Google G1 device via a T-Mobile employee eBay auction prior to release day.

== First remote car hacking exploit ==
Miller, along with Chris Valasek, is known for remotely hacking a 2014 Jeep Cherokee and controlling the braking, steering, and acceleration of the vehicle.

== Publications ==
- iOS Hacker Handbook
- The Mac Hacker's Handbook
- Fuzzing for Software Security Testing and Quality Assurance
- Battery firmware hacking: inside the innards of a smart battery
