= Doxbin (darknet) =

Defunct document sharing website

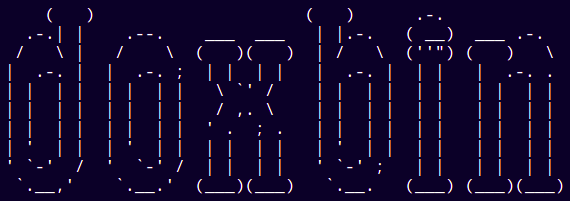
- Website type: Pastebin
- Founder: nachash
- Registration: Optional
- Launched: May 14, 2012; 14 years ago
- Current status: Defunct

Doxbin was an onion service in the form of a pastebin used to post or leak (often referred to as doxing) personal data of any person of interest.

Due to the illegal nature of much of the information it published (such as social security numbers, bank routing information, and credit card information, all in plain text), it was one of many sites seized during Operation Onymous, a multinational police initiative, in November 2014.

== History ==
Doxbin was established by an individual known online as "Nachash" to act as a secure, anonymous venue for the publication of a dox.

In November 2012, Doxbin's Twitter handle @Doxbin was attributed to an attack on Symantec, coordinated with Anonymous.

It first attracted attention in March 2014 when its then-owner hijacked a popular Tor hidden service, The Hidden Wiki, pointing its visitors to Doxbin instead as a response to the maintenance of pages dedicated to child pornography links. In June 2014, their Twitter account was suspended, prompting the site to start listing the personal information of the Twitter founders and CEO. In October 2014, Doxbin hosted personal information about Katherine Forrest, a federal judge responsible for court rulings against the owner of Tor-based black market Silk Road, leading to death threats and harassment.

Doxbin and several other hidden services were seized in November 2014 as part of the multinational police initiative Operation Onymous. Shortly thereafter, one of the site's operators who avoided arrest shared the site's logs and information about how it was compromised with the Tor developers email list, suggesting it could have either been the result of a specialized distributed denial-of-service attack (DDoS) or exploited mistakes in its PHP code. However, the site could still be restored easily by setting up a new domain.

== See also ==
- Cyberstalking legislation
- Doxbin (clearnet)
- Internet privacy
- Privacy law
