= Lolita City =

Defunct child pornography website

- Available in: English
- Commercial: yes
- Registration: Optional
- Users: 14,994 (June 2013)
- Launched: November 2010
- Current status: Offline

Lolita City was a child pornography website that used hidden services available through the Tor network. The site hosted images and videos of underage males and females up to 17 years of age (18 is the minimum legal age in many jurisdictions, including the US, for a person to appear in pornography). The website was hosted by Freedom Hosting, a defunct Tor-based web hosting provider.

== Background ==
As a hidden service, Lolita City operated through the .onion pseudo-top-level domain and could be accessed only via the Tor network. Like adult pornography sites, Lolita City featured and promoted specific models whom fans could follow. Some of the photographers were professionals, others were hobbyists. The site included softcore and hardcore images, and the subjects ranged from near-newborns and toddlers to 17-year-olds and included both boys and girls. As of June 2013, the website hosted about 1.4 million pictures. Videos had been available on the site since November 2012.

== 2011 anti-child porn operation by Anonymous ==
In October 2011, the hacktivist collective Anonymous launched "Operation Darknet", in an attempt to disrupt the activities of child porn sites accessed through hidden services. Anonymous published in a pastebin link what it claimed were the user names of 1,589 members of Lolita City, including membership time, and number of images uploaded. Anonymous said that it had found the site via The Hidden Wiki, and that it contained over 100 gigabytes of child pornography. Lolita City was taken offline for a short time in a denial-of-service attack by Anonymous.
