= RDP shop =

Cybercrime enterprise

An RDP shop is a website where access to hacked computers is sold to cybercriminals.

The computers may be acquired via scanning the web for open Remote Desktop Protocol connections and brute-forcing passwords. High-value ransomware targets are sometimes available such as airports. Access to a compromised machine retails from $3 to $19 depending on automatically gathered system and network metrics using a standardised back door.

Many such shops exist on the dark web.

Ukrainian sites such as xDedic do not sell access to machines within the former Soviet nations.
