= CovidLock =

Android ransomware campaign

Malware details
- Technical name: trojan.locker/andr
- Classification: Ransomware

Cyberattack event
- Date: March 2020

Technical details
- Platform: Android
- Written in: Java

CovidLock is an Android-based ransomware built with Java used in a ransomware campaign during the height of the COVID-19 pandemic that would pretend to be a coronavirus tracking tool which would ask for administrator permissions and accessibility permissions which would be used to lock the user from using their phone. It is one of the many apps that have used COVID-19 to spread themselves with social engineering.

== Operation ==
The ransomware was spread through an APK file on a website which was created in March 2020 claiming to track coronavirus infections and could only be installed through Android side-loading since the application was not on Google Play. When the app is ran, it asks for administrator permissions and accessibility permissions while maintaining persistence through BOOT_COMPLETED which would allow the app to startup after every device boot. After the user gives the permissions needed and clicks the "Scan Area For Coronavirus" button the app will change the screen to a ransom message asking the user to pay USD$100 to a Bitcoin address threatening to leak every photo and video the user has taken to everyone in their contact list and also delete all the contacts, videos, images, messages and other personal information on the device in 48 hours. The Bitcoin address which is needed to send the funds isn't hardcoded into the application's code and is instead shown on an anonymous Pastebin post which the user is redirected to through a bit.ly link, though the actual decryption key that is needed is hardcoded into the application's code as "4865083501" which, when used, tells the user their phone is now decrypted.

Another Pastebin ransom note from the ransomware instead asked for US$250 instead of just 100.

== Reactions ==
The Cybersecurity and Infrastructure Security Agency of the United States issued a warning about CovidLock and others that exploit the fear mongering of the coronavirus.
