= .tor =

Top-level domain

- Introduced: 2015
- TLD type: Pseudo-domain-style host suffix
- Status: Not in root, but used by OnioNS clients, servers, and proxies
- Registry: distributed
- Intended use: To facilitate the creation and management of unique, user-friendly domain names for Tor hidden services
- Structure: Names are requested by users to be mapped to respective .onion domains
- Documents: https://github.com/Jesse-V/OnioNS-literature
- Dispute policies: N/A
- Registry website: github.com/Jesse-V/OnioNS-HS

.tor is a pseudo-top-level domain host suffix implemented by the OnioNS project, which aims to add DNS infrastructure to the Tor network enabling the selection of meaningful and globally-unique domain name for hidden services, which users can then reference from the Tor Browser.

== Mission ==
The project aims to address the major usability issue that has been with Tor hidden services since their introduction in 2002.

== Overview ==
Beta release of the server, client and domain name reservation tool (so called hidden service) software parts and their supporting common library were announced in the Tor developers mailing list in August 2015.

According to the description on the projects gitsite "OnioNS is a distributed, privacy-enhanced, metadata-free, and highly usable DNS for Tor hidden services"

The system is powered by the Tor network, relies on a distributed database, and provides anonymity to both operators and users.

== See also ==
- .onion
