= The Hidden Wiki =

Defunct Tor wiki

- Website type: Internet directory
- Available in: English
- Commercial: No
- Registration: Optional
- Current status: Ambiguously forked

The Hidden Wiki was a dark web MediaWiki wiki operating as a Tor hidden service that could be anonymously edited after registering on the site. The main page served as a directory of links to other .onion sites.

== History ==
The first Hidden Wiki was operated through the .onion pseudo-top-level domain which can be accessed only by using Tor or a Tor gateway. Its main page provided a community-maintained link directory to other hidden services, including links claiming to offer money laundering, contract killing, cyber-attacks for hire, contraband chemicals, and bomb making. The rest of the wiki was essentially uncensored as well and also offered links to sites hosting child pornography and abuse images.

The earliest mention of the hidden wiki is from 2007 when it was located at 6sxoyfb3h2nvok2d.onion.

A well known iteration of the Hidden Wiki was founded some time before October 2011, coming to prominence with its associations with illegal content.

At some point prior to August 2013, the site was hosted on Freedom Hosting.

In March 2014 the site and its kpvz7ki2v5agwt35.onion domain was hacked and redirected to Doxbin. Following this event, the content began to be mirrored to more locations. During Operation Onymous in November 2014, after its Bulgarian hosting was compromised, the site served a message from law enforcement.

== Successors ==
There are several .onion websites hosting successors based on mirrors of the Hidden Wiki; as such, there is no longer one single official Hidden Wiki. Many are hosted for accessibility reasons, due to frequent downtime and instability of the main wiki, while others were launched in order to filter links to child pornography.
