= Freedom Hosting =

Defunct Tor web hosting service

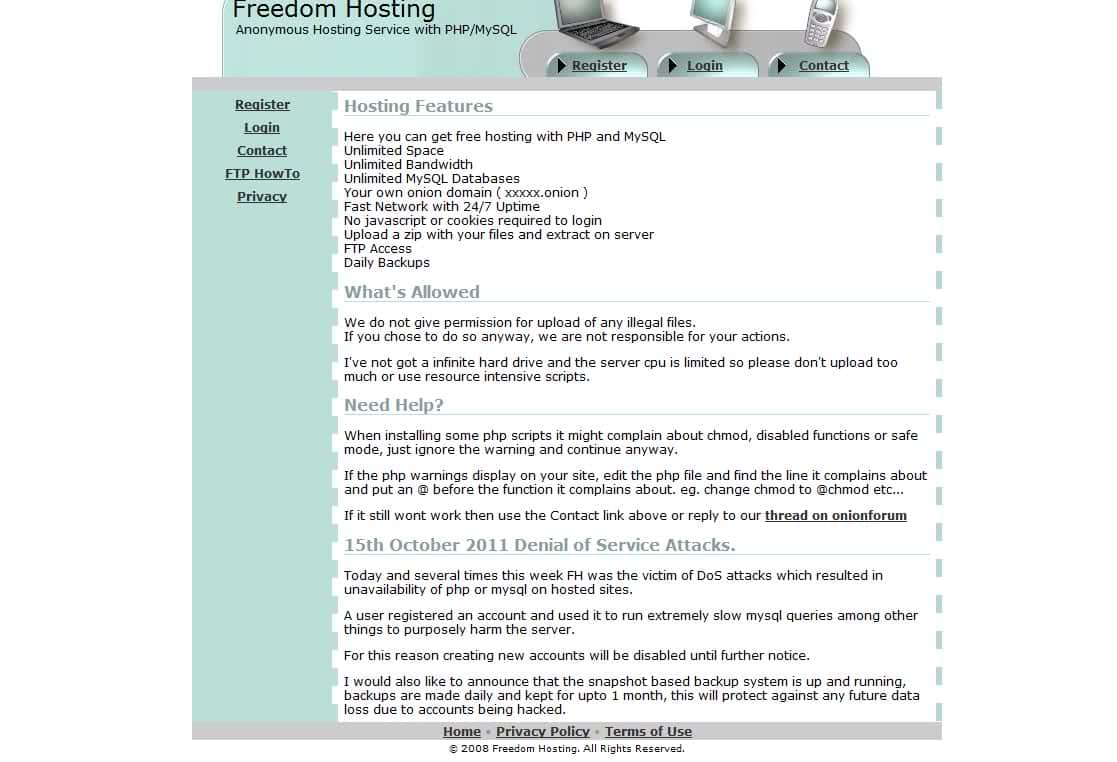
- Website type: Web hosting provider
- Founder: Eric Eoin Marques
- Users: Half of all Tor sites
- Written in: PHP

Freedom Hosting was a Tor specialist web hosting service that was established in 2008. At its height in August 2013, it was the largest Tor web host.

== Anonymous denial-of-service attack ==
In 2011, Anonymous launched Operation Darknet, an anti-child pornography effort against activities on the dark web. One of the largest sites, Lolita City, hosted by Freedom Hosting, was subject to a denial-of-service attack (DDoS), and later had its member list leaked following an SQL injection attack, as was The Hidden Wiki which linked to it.

== Federal investigation ==
In 2013, through undisclosed investigative methods, the FBI identified the IP address of a server that appeared to be associated with Freedom Hosting. The server was hosted by OVHcloud and was contracted under the name of Eric Marques. On July 22, 2013, pursuant to a mutual legal assistance treaty (MLAT) request to France, U.S. law enforcement received a copy of the data and information from this server. The server contained several encrypted "containers" for which law enforcement was unable to determine the content at the time. By July 30, 2013, investigators, through the use of cryptanalysis, were able to determine the password for the server's superuser account ("root"). This enabled law enforcement to obtain an unencrypted copy of the server's contents, confirming that the server was indeed hosting the Freedom Hosting website.

=== De-anonymization attack ===
On August 4, 2013, several Tor hidden services hosted by Freedom Hosting, including TorMail, began displaying an error message. Source code analysis revealed the presence of a small JavaScript executable that exploited a vulnerability in outdated versions of the Tor Browser. The executable retrieved the Windows hostname and MAC address of the user's computer, transmitting this information to a server controlled by U.S. law enforcement.

The FBI acknowledged they were responsible for the attack in a 12 September 2013 court filing in Dublin; further technical details from a training presentation leaked by Edward Snowden showed that the codename for the exploit was EgotisticalGiraffe.

=== Founder and legal proceedings ===
The site was founded and administered by an American-Irish citizen, Eric Eoin Marques (born April 29, 1985), who was born in New York City to an Irish mother and a Brazilian-born Portuguese father who worked as a successful architect. He had been referred to a psychiatrist as a young teenager with no specific diagnosis made. He was described as timid and socially withdrawn, and had failed to complete school.

In 2005, Marques started a business named Host Ultra with his father before dissolving it in 2011. His father had justified the large amounts of money Marques made by claiming he worked at a bank.

Marques was arrested in Ireland on 1 August 2013, on a provisional extradition warrant issued by a United States court on the 29th of July that year. The FBI sought to extradite Marques to Maryland on four charges — distributing, conspiring to distribute, and advertising child pornography — as well as aiding and abetting advertising of child pornography. The warrant alleges that Marques was "the largest facilitator of child porn on the planet". His attorneys fought for several years to prevent his extradition to the United States on the grounds that he had Asperger's syndrome and would not receive the appropriate care in a US prison if extradited.

In December 2016, the Irish Court of Appeal ruled the extradition should proceed. This was not the end of his appeal process, however, and his lawyers announced they would make a new appeal to the Supreme Court. This appeal was dismissed by the Irish Supreme Court on 20 March 2019. Marques faced life in prison if tried and convicted in the United States.

On 6 February 2020, Marques pleaded guilty to one count of conspiracy to advertise child abuse images, as part of a plea agreement that would entail a prison term of 15 to 21 years. On 6 September 2021, Marques was sentenced to 27 years imprisonment and ordered to forfeit over $154,000.

== Notable hosted sites ==
- HackBB
- Lolita City
- Tor Mail
- The Hidden Wiki

== Successor ==
After the closure of Freedom Hosting, a new service, Freedom Hosting II, was created. In 2017, it ran 20 percent of all websites on the Tor network. It was taken permanently offline later in 2017 during a coordinated hacking attack.
