= HackBB =

Defunct Tor forum

- Website type: Internet forum
- Available in: English
- Founder: OptimusCrime
- Commercial: Yes
- Current status: Offline

HackBB was a Tor service Internet forum specializing in buying stolen credit cards, skimming ATMs, and hacking computers, servers and accounts. The site was often a destination for hacked and stolen data dumps. At some point the site was hosted by Tor hosting company Freedom Hosting.

The site was founded by 'OptimusCrime' in the earlier days of Tor. In June 2012, user 'Boneless' was promoted to an administrator role, who went on to handle site escrow. However, in March 2013 Boneless's account was used to destroy the site's database, and again in May by some accounts he secretly created. The site initially recovered from this, but shut down sometime afterwards due to the loss of faith in the site's administration and the raid on its host Freedom Hosting in August 2013.
