= Doxbin =

Doxbin may refer to:

- Doxbin (clearnet), a pastebin used to post personal information
- Doxbin (darknet), a defunct pastebin hosted on Tor used to post personal information
