= 2016 MERNIS scandal =

2016 MERNIS scandal is leak of private data of citizens of Turkey which had rights to vote in 2009 local elections to the internet. The scandal was considered as one of the biggest leaks in history, as well as leading to major investigations.

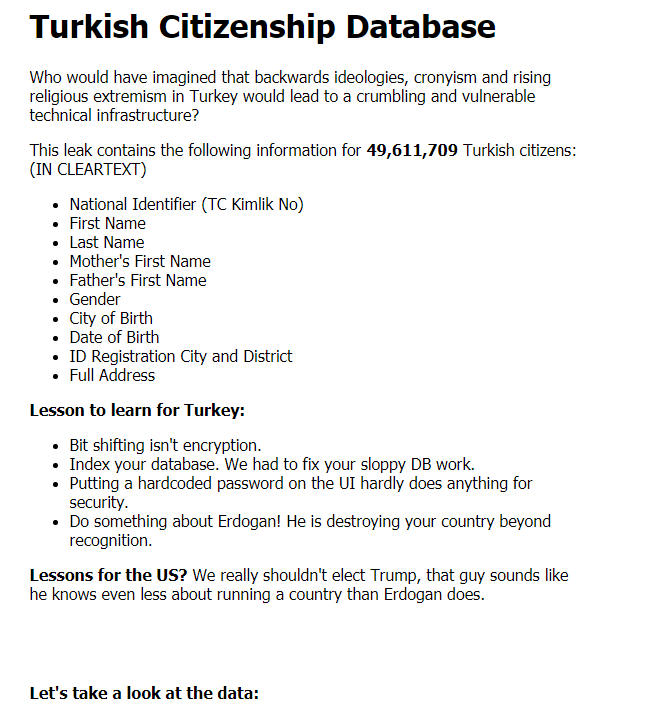
The screenshot of the website which leaked information was published.

== The incident ==
The background of the leak was dating back to 2010, when the datas were sold by officials for money. All the datas were leaked by 2016, and published in a site which had .onion extension.

The data leak, in which the personal data of over 49-50 million people was shared, has gone down in history as one of the largest data leaks in internet history. The website was banned quickly after the leak. minister of Transport and Infrastructure Binali Yıldırım denied the incident and claimed that the datas were from another leak before. Bekir Bozdağ, minister of justice in Turkey, stated that the investigations began about the incident.

== See also ==
- scandal
