= PrivateBin =

Open source online pastebin

- Other names: Private Bin
- Release: July 9, 2016; 10 years ago
- Stable release: 2.0.5 / 11 July 2026; 20 days ago
- Written in: PHP, JavaScript
- Type: Pastebin
- License: zlib License
- Website: privatebin.info
- Repository: github.com/PrivateBin/PrivateBin

PrivateBin is self-hosted and open source pastebin software that deletes pasted text after a visit. It can be configured to not delete the paste after first view, at which point there is an option of commenting and replying to the paste, like on an Internet forum. All pastes on PrivateBin are encrypted with a password. The encryption is both during transport and at rest.

PrivateBin was forked from ZeroBin.

== Features ==
PrivateBin also supports:

- QR code generation from URLs for sharing
- Language selection
- File upload support
- Syntax highlighting with prettify.js
- Markdown support
- Expiry after first visit or certain time.
