= XDedic =

Ukrainian crime forum, RDP shop and marketplace

xDedic
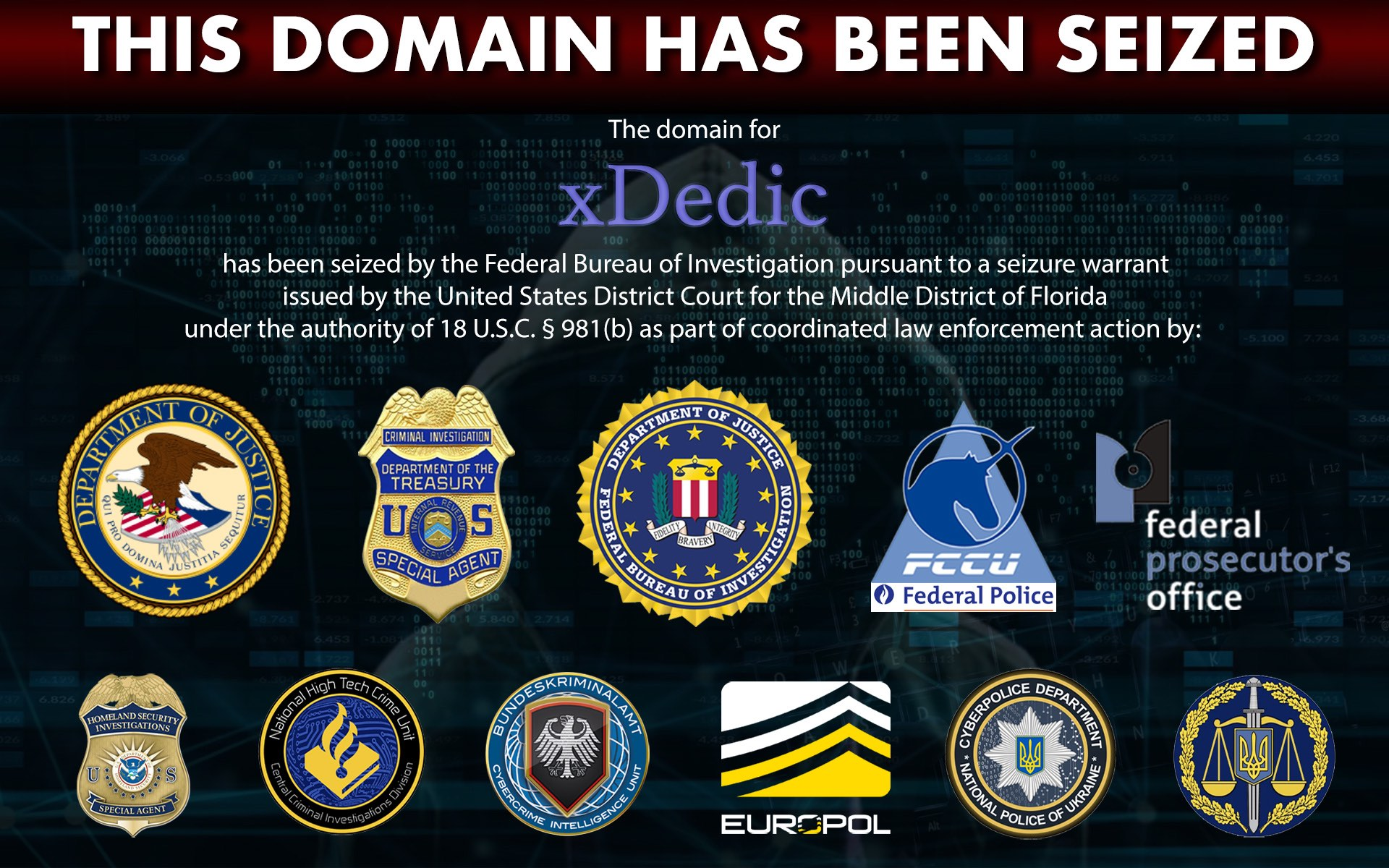
- Seizure banner placed on the now defunct xDedic website
- Website type: Internet forum
- Available in: Ukrainian
- Country of origin: Ukraine
- Website: xdedic.biz
- Commercial: Yes
- Current status: Defunct

xDedic was a Ukrainian-language crime forum, RDP shop and marketplace.

== History ==
Founded some time in 2014, it was revealed in June 2016 Kaspersky Lab report as being a major hub in the trade of compromised servers. As of May 2016, 70,624 servers were offered for sale. Following this report, the site shut down only to quickly re-emerge on the Tor dark web.

== Services ==
The compromised servers were focused on the areas of online gambling, ecommerce, banks and payment processors, online dating, advertising networks, ISP services, email service providers, web browser and instant messenger services. Various crimeware products were for sale.

The site featured a partner portal for the secure and verified listing of compromised data and standardised backdoor to be used.

== Shut down ==
In January 2019, American and Belgian authorities working with Europol, Eurojust and Ukraine shut down xDedic, raiding sites and seizing the domain.

As of January 2020 the FBI are asking victims of machine take overs to come forward. In November 2022, a Moldovan site administrator was extradited from the Canary Islands, Spain to the United States.
