= Pastebin.com =

Online text storage website

Pastebin

- Website type: Web application
- Creator: Paul Dixon
- Website: pastebin.com
- IPv6 support: Yes
- Registration: Optional (required for creating private pastes)
- Users: 17 million (2019)
- Launched: September 3, 2002; 24 years ago
- Current status: Active
- Written in: PHP

Pastebin.com is a text storage site. It was created on September 3, 2002 by Paul Dixon, and reached 1 million active pastes (excluding spam and expired pastes) eight years later, in 2010.

It features syntax highlighting for a variety of programming and markup languages, as well as view counters for pastes and user profiles. Users can submit pastes as guests without registration, but an account allows managing pastes.

== History ==
By October 2011, the site's active pastes numbers exceeded 10 million.

- In July 2012, the owners of Pastebin.com tweeted that they had surpassed the 20 million active pastes mark.
- On June 9, 2015, they announced they had reached 65 million active pastes. They also mentioned that around 75% of pastes are either unlisted or private.
- In December 2015, Pastebin.com reached 95 million active pastes, and more than 2 million members.

During the 2014 Venezuelan protests, Pastebin.com was blocked by the country's government as one of the sites used by activists sharing information pertaining to the protests.

In April 2020, Pastebin.com removed their built-in search feature and restricted their web scraping API, including for paid lifetime subscribers of Pastebin Pro. As an additional spam prevention measure, pastes from users not logged in are hidden from the list of recent pastes, visible in the site's side bar.

In September 2020, two new features were added to the site. Users became able to password-protect pastes from viewing and request the paste be deleted immediately once viewed.

On October 14, 2020, the terms of service were updated and the mention that contributions were CC BY-SA was removed.

Pastebin.com is a popular source of .onion links that lead to the dark web.

== See also ==
- Pastebin
- Snippet (programming)
