= Insurance as regulation =

Some insurance markets effectively function as regulation, due to insurance companies encouraging or requiring certain actions in order to gain coverage. Although many economists argue that insurers can reduce moral hazard to some degree, it is debated the extent to which insurers can effectively substitute for government regulations to reduce risk. An example is cyber insurance companies working with their clients to improve security at the firms and decrease the risk of cyberattacks and data breaches.
