= Doxbin (clearnet) =

Document sharing website

- Website type: Pastebin
- Available in: English
- Website: doxbin.org (historical) doxbin.com (active)
- Registration: Optional
- Users: >90,000 (as of September 2025)

Doxbin is a pastebin used to post or leak personal data (often referred to as doxing).

== Operators ==
In 2019, American journalist Brian Krebs reported: "The individual who appears to maintain the Doxbin... stated that he also was responsible for maintaining SiegeCulture, a white supremacist website that glorifies the writings of neo-Nazi James Mason".

In July 2020, John William Kirby Kelley, who was involved in a neo-Nazi swatting conspiracy and a group associated with a neo-Nazi terrorist network known as Atomwaffen Division, as well as the Deadnet IRC channel and its participants, were linked to the group that maintains Doxbin. According to federal prosecutors, the group maintains Doxbin to list past and potential swatting targets.

== Doxbin and Lapsus$ ==
"White" was a founding leader of a ransomware group named Lapsus$ which had a list of data breaches from groups including Nvidia, T-Mobile, and Rockstar Games.

The feud between the former Doxbin owner "kt" and White had been ongoing since he leaked the Doxbin database.

kt had eventually doxed White on January 8, 2022, and published his personal details onto Doxbin.

White's house was raided by police on the morning of April 1, 2022 and earlier in December 2021, both in relation to Lapsus$.

White was charged with:

- Three counts of unauthorized access to a computer with intent to impair the reliability of data;
- One count of fraud by false representation;
- One count of unauthorized access to a computer with intent to hinder access to data;
- One count of causing a computer to perform a function to secure unauthorized access to a program.
