= Numerama =

French technology news website

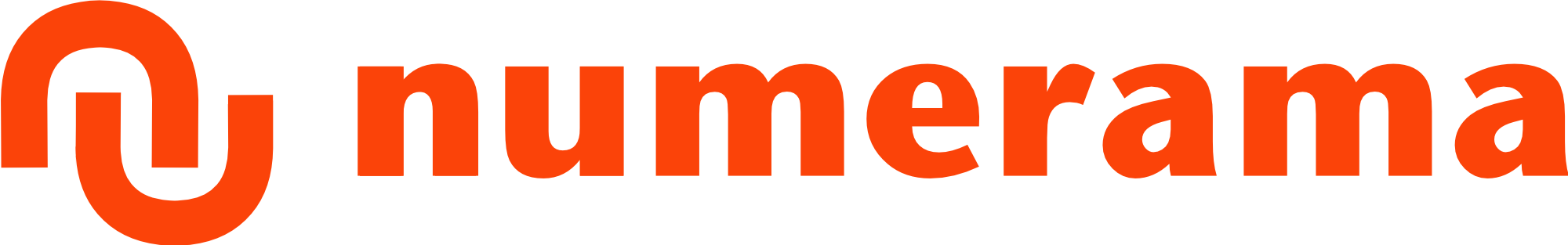
- Former name: Ratiatum
- Available in: French
- Headquarters: Paris
- Founder: Guillaume Champeau
- Website: www.numerama.com
- Commercial: Yes
- Launched: April 2002

Numerama (formerly Ratiatum) is a French language news website that focuses on digital and internet technology. It was founded in April 2002 by Guillaume Champeau and was published by his company PressTIC until 2015, when it was bought by Humanoid. In September 2011, Numerama was ranked the 10th most social pure play site on Facebook.

== History ==
Guillaume Champeau started the site in April 2002 as a blog about peer-to-peer file sharing, the culture industry, and related economic and legal issues. He named it Ratiatum for the Roman settlement on the site of the city of Rezé, where he grew up, and renamed it to Numerama in 2008. Champeau moved to Canada after qualifying as a lawyer, but later chose to leave the law and remained the site's editor-in-chief until 2016.

In October 2015, Champeau and his business partners, Guillaume Cavaille and Erwan Delahaye, sold PressTIC, the company that published Numerama, to the French online media company Humanoid. In October 2015, while still under Champeau's editorship, it was redesigned and underwent editorial changes as one of the Humanoid brands.

A total redesign was announced in December 2021, along with the introduction of paid subscriptions that would permit an ad-free experience and more opportunities for interaction.

== Scope ==
The site evolved to have a broader focus, which led Champeau to rename it to Numerama. It analyzes the interactions between digital and Internet business models, the practices of users, and their legal framework. It often takes a critical stance, because it champions the principles of the free sharing culture, network neutrality, freedom of expression, and respect for online privacy. For example, in 2008 it appealed to site users to make videos arguing the case against the HADOPI law.

In its 2015 refocusing by Humanoid, Numerama's editorial scope was further broadened to include pop culture, the future of transportation, and cyberwarfare; sub-sections with their own social media accounts devoted to cars (Vroom) and cyberwarfare (Cyberguerre) were launched in October and November 2018.

=== Ratiatum Magazin ===
At the end of 2004, Ratiatum launched a monthly magazine called Ratiatum Magazin, as a paper complement to the website. The magazine was discontinued after issue 2 because the publisher Mediastone filed for bankruptcy.

== Audience ==
In September 2011, Numerama was ranked by Le Journal du Net2 the 10th most social pure play site on Facebook. In fall 2015 it had 466,000 unique visitors per month; in February 2019, Humanoid reported that the site had 2 million unique visitors per month; by December 2021, 7–10 million.
