= Pastebin =

Type of online content hosting service where users can store plain text

A pastebin or text storage site is a type of online content-hosting service where users can store plain text (e.g. source code snippets or error logs). The most well-known pastebin is the eponymous pastebin.com, created in 2002. Many sites with similar functionality now exist, and several open source pastebin applications are available for self-hosting.

Text storage websites such as Pastebin allows users to create accounts in order to manage and organize their content. After registering, users can create and store multiple text entries, commonly referred to as "pastes". Account holders typically have the ability to edit or delete their stored content at any time. Many platforms also provide privacy options, allowing users to set their pastes as public or private depending on their preferences.

Pastebins may provide additional features such as commenting, rendering markup (e.g. Markdown, ReStructuredText), or version control.

== History ==
Pastebin was developed in the late 1990s to facilitate IRC chatrooms devoted to computing, where users naturally need to share large blocks of computer input or output in a line-oriented medium. In such chatrooms, sending messages containing large blocks of computer data can disrupt conversations, which can be closely interleaved. When users send such messages, they are often warned to instead use pastebins or risk being banned from the service. Contrarily, a reference to a pastebin entry is a one-line hyperlink.

A new class of IRC bot has evolved. In a chatroom that is largely oriented around a few pastebins, nothing more needs to be done after a post at its pastebin. The receiving party then awaits a bot announcing the expected posting by the known user.

After the use of the pastebin.pl pastebin for a data breach, Pastebin started monitoring the site for illegally pasted data and information, leading to a backlash from Anonymous. Hacktivists teamed up with an organization calling itself the People's Liberation Front, launching an alternative called AnonPaste.

== See also ==
- Doxbin (clearnet)
- Netiquette
- Pastebin.com
- PrivateBin
- Snippet (programming)
- Text file
