= Dark web =

World Wide Web content existing on darknets

The dark web is the World Wide Web content that exists on darknets (overlay networks) that use the Internet, but require specific software, configurations, or authorization to access. Through the dark web, private computer networks can communicate and conduct business anonymously without divulging identifying information, such as a user's location. The dark web forms a small part of the deep web, the part of the web not indexed by web search engines, although sometimes the term deep web is mistakenly used to refer specifically to the dark web.

The darknets which constitute the dark web include small, friend-to-friend networks, as well as large, popular networks such as Tor, Hyphanet, I2P, and Riffle operated by public organizations and individuals. Users of the dark web refer to the regular web as clearnet due to its unencrypted nature. The Tor dark web or onionland uses the traffic anonymization technique of onion routing under the network's top-level domain suffix .onion.

== Terminology ==
=== Definition ===
The dark web has often been confused with the deep web, the parts of the web not indexed (searchable) by search engines. The term dark web first emerged in 2009; however, it is unknown when the actual dark web first emerged. Many internet users only use the surface web, data that can be accessed by a typical web browser. The dark web forms a small part of the deep web, but requires custom software in order to access its content. This confusion dates back to at least 2009. Since then, especially in reporting on Silk Road, the two terms have often been conflated, despite recommendations that they should be distinguished.

Tor software logo

The dark web, also known as darknet websites, are accessible only through networks such as Tor ("The Onion Routing" project) that are created specifically for the dark web. Tor browser and Tor-accessible sites are widely used among the darknet users and can be identified by the domain ".onion". Tor browsers create encrypted entry points and pathways for the user, allowing their dark web searches and actions to be anonymous.

Identities and locations of darknet users stay anonymous and cannot be tracked due to the layered encryption system. The darknet encryption technology routes users' data through a large number of intermediate servers, which protects the users' identity and guarantees anonymity. The transmitted information can be decrypted only by a subsequent node in the scheme, which leads to the exit node. The complicated system makes it almost impossible to reproduce the node path and decrypt the information layer by layer. Due to the high level of encryption, websites are not able to track geolocation and IP of their users, and users are not able to get this information about the host. Thus, communication between darknet users is highly encrypted allowing users to talk, blog, and share files confidentially.

== Content ==
Web-based onion services in February 2016
Category	% of total	% of active
Violence	0.3	0.6
Arms	0.8	1.5
Illicit Social	1.2	2.4
Hacking	1.8	3.5
Illicit links	2.3	4.3
Illicit pornography	2.3	4.5
Extremism	2.7	5.1
Illicit Other	3.8	7.3
Illicit Finance	6.3	12
Illicit Drugs	8.1	15.5
Non-illicit+Unknown	22.6	43.2
Illicit total	29.7	56.8
Inactive	47.7
Active	52.3

A December 2014 study by Gareth Owen from the University of Portsmouth found that the most commonly hosted type of content on Tor was child pornography, followed by black markets, while the individual sites with the highest traffic were dedicated to botnet operations (see attached metric). Many whistleblowing sites maintain a presence as well as political discussion forums. Sites associated with Bitcoin, fraud-related services, and mail order services are some of the most prolific.

As of December 2020, the number of active Tor sites in .onion was estimated at 76,300 (containing a lot of copies). Of these, 18,000 would have original content.

In July 2017, Roger Dingledine, one of the three founders of the Tor Project, said that Facebook is the biggest hidden service. The dark web comprises only 3% of the traffic in the Tor network.

A February 2016 study from researchers at King's College London gives the following breakdown of content by an alternative category set, highlighting the illicit use of .onion services.

=== Ransomware ===
Ransomware groups rely on dark web infrastructure across the attack lifecycle. Ransomware-as-a-Service (RaaS) operators recruit affiliates through dark web forums such as RAMP and, prior to bans imposed after the 2021 Colonial Pipeline attack, Exploit and XSS, where they advertise toolkits, commission structures typically offering affiliates 60–80% of ransom proceeds, and vet prospective partners. Most prominent ransomware groups also operate dedicated data leak sites on the Tor network as part of a double extortion model pioneered by the Maze ransomware group in November 2019, in which stolen data is published or threatened to be published if victims refuse to pay, with groups such as LockBit, ALPHV/BlackCat, and Cl0p hosting data from hundreds of victim organizations. Rather than conducting the full attack lifecycle independently, many ransomware affiliates purchase pre-established network access from initial access brokers (IABs), specialized threat actors who compromise organizations through methods such as exploiting vulnerable systems, phishing, or leveraging credentials from infostealer malware, and sell that access on underground forums, with listings typically priced by factors including victim revenue, access type (VPN, RDP, Active Directory), and geographic location. This division of labor has created an efficient criminal supply chain that lowers the technical barrier to entry for ransomware attacks.

=== Botnets ===
Botnets are often structured with their command-and-control servers based on a censorship-resistant hidden service, creating a large amount of bot-related traffic.

=== Darknet markets ===
Commercial darknet markets mediate transactions for illegal goods and typically use Bitcoin as payment. These markets have attracted significant media coverage, starting with the popularity of Silk Road and its subsequent seizure by legal authorities. Silk Road was one of the first dark web marketplaces that emerged in 2011 and has allowed for the trading of illegal drugs, weapons and identity fraud resources. These markets have no protection for its users and can be closed down at any time by authorities. Despite the closures of these marketplaces, others pop up in their place. As of 2020, there have been at least 38 active dark web market places, even though there can be many more. In April 2022, US and German authorities shut down Hydra Market, described by US officials as the world's largest darknet market; Hydra had handled an estimated 80% of cryptocurrency transactions linked to darknet markets in 2021. These marketplaces are similar to that of eBay or Craigslist where users can interact with sellers and leave reviews about marketplace products.

Examination of price differences in dark web markets versus prices in real life or over the World Wide Web have been attempted as well as studies in the quality of goods received over the dark web. One such study was performed on Evolution, one of the most popular crypto-markets active from January 2013 to March 2015. Although it found the digital information, such as concealment methods and shipping country, "seems accurate", the study uncovered issues with the quality of illegal drugs sold in Evolution, stating that, "the illicit drugs purity is found to be different from the information indicated on their respective listings". Less is known about consumer motivations for accessing these marketplaces and factors associated with their use. Darknet markets have also provided leaked credit card information that was made available for free.

=== Bitcoin services ===
Bitcoin is one of the main cryptocurrencies used in dark web marketplaces due to the flexibility and relative anonymity of the currency. With bitcoin, people can hide their intentions as well as their identity. A common approach was to use a digital currency exchanger service which converted bitcoin into an online game currency (such as gold coins in World of Warcraft) that will later be converted back into fiat currency. Bitcoin services such as tumblers are often available on Tor, and some – such as Grams – offer darknet market integration. A research study undertaken by Jean-Loup Richet, a research fellow at ESSEC, and carried out with the United Nations Office on Drugs and Crime, highlighted new trends in the use of bitcoin tumblers for money laundering purposes, using escrows.

Due to its relevance in the digital world, bitcoin has become a popular product for users to scam companies with. Cybercriminal groups such as DDOS"4" have led to over 140 cyberattacks on companies since the emergence of bitcoins in 2014. These attacks have led to the formation of other cybercriminal groups as well as Cyber Extortion.

=== Hacking groups and services ===
Many hackers sell their services either individually or as a part of groups. Such groups include xDedic, hackforum, Trojanforge, Mazafaka, dark0de and the TheRealDeal darknet market. Some have been known to track and extort apparent pedophiles. Cyber crimes and hacking services for financial institutions and banks have also been offered over the dark web. Attempts to monitor this activity have been made through various government and private organizations, and an examination of the tools used can be found in the Procedia Computer Science journal. Use of Internet-scale DNS distributed reflection denial of service (DRDoS) attacks have also been made through leveraging the dark web. There are many scam .onion sites also present which end up giving tools for download that are infected with trojan horses or backdoors.

Recently, around 100,000 compromised ChatGPT users' login information was sold on the dark web in 2023. Additionally, the logs showed, in the opinion of the researchers, that the majority of the compromised ChatGPT passwords had been extracted by the data-stealing virus Raccoon.

=== Financing and fraud ===
Scott Dueweke the president and founder of Zebryx Consulting states that Russian electronic currency such as WebMoney and Perfect Money are behind the majority of the illegal actions. In April 2015, Flashpoint received a 5 million dollar investment to help their clients gather intelligence from the deep and dark web. There are numerous carding forums, PayPal and bitcoin trading websites as well as fraud and counterfeiting services. Many such sites are scams themselves. Phishing via cloned websites and other scam sites are numerous, with darknet markets often advertised with fraudulent URLs.

=== Illegal pornography ===
The type of content that has the most popularity on the dark web is illegal pornography—more specifically, child pornography. About 80% of its web traffic is related to accessing child pornography despite it being difficult to find even on the dark web. A website called Lolita City, which has since been taken down, contained over 100 GB of child pornographic media and had about 15,000 members.

There is regular law enforcement action against sites distributing child pornography – often via compromising the site and tracking users' IP addresses. In 2015, the FBI investigated and took down a website called Playpen. At the time, Playpen was the largest child pornography website on the dark web with over 200,000 members. Sites use complex systems of guides, forums and community regulation. Other content includes sexualised torture and killing of animals and revenge porn. In May 2021, German police said that they had dismantled one of the world's biggest child pornography networks on the dark web known as Boystown; the website had over 400,000 registered users. Four people had been detained in raids, including a man from Paraguay, on suspicion of running the network. Europol said several pedophile chat sites were also taken down in the German-led intelligence operation. In April 2025, German police said they had dismantled KidFlix, a dark web platform used to distribute child sexual abuse material that had 1.8 million users worldwide; the operation was coordinated by Europol.

=== Terrorism ===
Terrorist organizations took to the internet as early as the 1990s; the birth of the dark web attracted these organizations due to the anonymity, lack of regulation, social interaction, and easy accessibility. These groups have been taking advantage of the chat platforms within the dark web to inspire terrorist attacks. Groups have even posted "How To" guides, teaching people how to become and hide their identities as terrorists.

The dark web became a forum for terrorist propaganda, guiding information, and most importantly, funding. With the introduction of Bitcoin, anonymous transactions were created which allowed for anonymous donations and funding. By accepting Bitcoin, terrorists were now able to fund purchases of weaponry. In 2018, an individual named Ahmed Sarsur was charged for attempting to purchase explosives and hire snipers to aid Syrian terrorists, as well as attempting to provide them financial support, all through the dark web.

There are at least some real and fraudulent websites claiming to be used by ISIL (ISIS), including a fake one seized in Operation Onymous. With the increase of technology, it has allowed cyber terrorists to flourish by attacking the weaknesses of the technology. In the wake of the November 2015 Paris attacks, an actual such site was hacked by an Anonymous-affiliated hacker group, GhostSec, and replaced with an advert for Prozac. The Rawti Shax Islamist group was found to be operating on the dark web at one time.

=== Social media ===
Within the dark web, there exists emerging social media platforms similar to those on the World Wide Web, this is known as the Dark Web Social Network (DWSN). The DWSN works a like a regular social networking site where members can have customizable pages, have friends, like posts, and blog in forums. Facebook and other traditional social media platforms have begun to make dark-web versions of their websites to address problems associated with the traditional platforms and to continue their service in all areas of the World Wide Web. Unlike most of traditional social media, however, the privacy policy of the DWSN requires that members are to reveal absolutely no personal information and remain anonymous.

=== Hoaxes and unverified content ===
There are reports of crowdfunded assassinations and hitmen for hire; however, these are believed to be exclusively scams. The creator of Silk Road, Ross Ulbricht, was arrested by Homeland Security investigations (HSI) for his site and allegedly hiring a hitman to kill six people, although the charges were later dropped. There is an urban legend that one can find live murder on the dark web. The term "Red Room" has been coined based on the Japanese animation and urban legend of the same name; however, the evidence points toward all reported instances being hoaxes.

On June 25, 2015, the indie game Sad Satan was reviewed by youtubers Obscure Horror Corner which they claimed to have found via the dark web. Various inconsistencies in the channel's reporting cast doubt on the reported version of events. There are several websites which analyze and monitor the deep web and dark web for threat intelligence.

== Policing the dark web ==
There have been arguments that the dark web promotes civil liberties, like "free speech, privacy, anonymity". Some prosecutors and government agencies are concerned that it is a haven for criminal activity. The deep and dark web are applications of integral internet features to provide privacy and anonymity. Policing involves targeting specific activities of the private web deemed illegal or subject to internet censorship.

When investigating online suspects, police typically use the IP (Internet Protocol) address of the individual; however, due to Tor browsers creating anonymity, this becomes an impossible tactic. As a result, law enforcement has employed many other tactics in order to identify and arrest those engaging in illegal activity on the dark web. OSINT, or Open Source Intelligence, are data collection tools that legally collect information from public sources. OSINT tools can be dark web specific to help officers find bits of information that would lead them to gaining more knowledge about interactions going on in the dark web.

In 2015 Interpol began a dedicated dark web training program featuring technical information on Tor, cybersecurity and simulated darknet market takedowns. In October 2013 the UK's National Crime Agency and GCHQ announced the formation of a "Joint Operations Cell" to focus on cybercrime. In November 2015 this team would be tasked with tackling child exploitation on the dark web as well as other cybercrime. In March 2017 the Congressional Research Service released an extensive report on the dark web, noting the changing dynamic of how information is accessed and presented on it; characterized by the unknown, it is of increasing interest to researchers, law enforcement, and policymakers. In August 2017, according to reportage, cybersecurity firms which specialize in monitoring and researching the dark web on behalf of banks and retailers routinely share their findings with the FBI and with other law enforcement agencies "when possible and necessary" regarding illegal content. The Russian-speaking underground offering a crime-as-a-service model is regarded as being particularly robust.

== Journalism ==
Many journalists, alternative news organizations, educators, and researchers are influential in their writing and speaking of the dark web, and making its use clear to the general public. Media coverage typically reports on the dark web in two ways; detailing the power and freedom of speech the dark web allows people to express, or more commonly reaffirms the illegality and fear of its contents, such as computer hackers. Many headlines tie the dark web to child pornography with headlines such as, "N.J. man charged with surfing 'Dark Web' to collect nearly 3K images of child porn", along with other illegal activities where news outlets describe it as "a hub for black markets that sell or distribute drugs".

Specialist Clearweb news sites such as DeepDotWeb and All Things Vice provide news coverage and practical information about dark web sites and services; however, DeepDotWeb was shut down by authorities in 2019. The Hidden Wiki and its mirrors and forks hold some of the largest directories of content at any given time. Traditional media and news channels, such as ABC News (Australia), have also featured articles examining the darknet.

== See also ==
- List of Tor onion services
- Tor – Free and open-source anonymity network based on onion routing
