= Pseudo-top-level domain =

Unofficial computer network domain

A pseudo-top-level domain is a label or name for a computer network that is not participating in the world-wide official Domain Name System and may not even participate in the Internet, but may use a similar domain name hierarchy. Historically the best known large networks in this group were .bitnet, .csnet, .oz, and .uucp, for which many Internet mail forwarders provided connectivity. In addition, newer networks like .exit and .i2p may be included. (The newest draft of the proposal expired on July 28, 2015, without becoming a standard.) Some domains such as .onion later became officially recognised.

Although these networks or domain names have no official status, some are generally regarded as having been unofficially grandfathered, and are unlikely ever to be allocated as top-level domains.

Pseudo-top-level domains are also sometimes used for fictitious domain names in video games and other media in order to prevent practical jokers and curious people from either bothering websites and organizations by reaching the domains they see in works of fiction, or registering the domain name in an attempt of cybersquatting.

== See also ==
- Alternative DNS root
- .local
- .arpa
