= List of internet forums =

An internet forum, or message board, is an online discussion site where people can hold conversations in the form of posted messages. They are an element of social media technologies which take on many different forms including blogs, business networks, enterprise social networks, forums, microblogs, photo sharing, products/services review, social bookmarking, social gaming, social networks, video sharing, and virtual worlds.

Forums act as centralized locations for topical discussion. The Forum format is derived from BBS and Usenet. This is a list of the most notable and significant internet forums communities that have converged around topics ranging from medicine to technology, and vocations and hobbies.

== 0–9 ==
- 2channel (2ちゃんねる)
- 4chan
- 420chan (defunct)
- 6park
- 8chan (Infinite Chan)

== A ==
- Airliners.net
- AR15.com
- AtariAge
- ATRL
- AutoAdmit
- Avsim.com
- MyAnimeList

== B ==
- Baidu Tieba (百度贴吧)
- Beyond.ca
- Bleeping Computer
- Blind
- Bluelight
- Blurtit
- boards.ie
- Bodybuilding.com
- Bored of Studies
- BPDFamily.com
- BlackHatWorld

== C ==
- Carder.su (defunct)
- City-Data
- ClutchFans
- collectSPACE
- College Confidential
- CompuServe (defunct)
- Computational Chemistry List
- Craigslist

== D ==
- Dark0de (defunct)
- DarkMarket (defunct)
- DataLounge (defunct)
- DC Inside
- Dek-D.com
- Democratic Underground
- Delphi Forums
- Digital Photography Review
- Digital Spy
- DISCUSS
- Dread
- DSLReports (defunct)
- The D-Word
- Dvach

== E ==
- Easy Allies (defunct)
- eComFuel
- Eng-Tips Forums
- Ekşi Sözlük
- Edugeek
- Elakiri
- Emirates Discussion Forum (Arabic: منتدى الحوار الإماراتي)
- eBaum's World
- Experts Exchange

== F ==
- Fanfiction.net
- Fark
- Flickr
- Flashback Forum
- Flightsim.com
- Flyertalk
- FOK!
- ForoCoches
- Forum.hr
- Futaba Channel (2chan)

== G ==
- Gaia Online
- GameFAQs
- GameSpot
- Gearspace

== H ==
- HackBB (defunct)
- Hacker News
- HackThisSite
- Head for Points
- HealthBoards
- The Hive (defunct)
- HotCopper
- HKGolden
- The Hub (defunct)

== I ==
- IGN Boards
- Ilbe Storehouse (일베저장소)
- Iron March (defunct)

== K ==
- Kaskus
- KiwiFarms
- Krstarica

== L ==
- LIHKG
- LinuxQuestions.org
- Literotica
- LessWrong

== M ==
- MacRumors
- MacTalk Australia (defunct)
- Maes-e
- Miestai.net
- Milnet.ca
- MindVox (defunct)
- MoneySavingExpert.com
- Mop.com
- MozillaZine
- Mumsnet

== N ==
- Nairaland
- NamePros
- NationStates
- NeoGAF
- Neopets
- Neowin
- Newgrounds
- Nexopia
- Nexus Mods
- NikeTalk
- NYCAviation

== P ==
- Pandlr
- PbNation
- PistonHeads
- Professional Pilots Rumour Network
- PTT Bulletin Board System

== Q ==
- Quora

== R ==
- Reddit
- ResetEra
- RLLMUK
- Russian Anonymous Marketplace (defunct)
- Rigveda Wiki

== S ==
- Server.com (defunct)
- SkyscraperCity
- SkyscraperPage.com
- ShadowCrew (defunct)
- Sherdog
- Slashdot
- Something Awful
- Stack Overflow
- Steve Hoffman Music Forums
- Stormfront
- Student Doctor Network
- The Student Room
- Suomi24
- Sporcle

== T ==
- Tbilisis Forumi
- TexAgs
- TechNet (defunct)
- Tianya Club
- Topix (website) (defunct)
- Tor Carding Forum (defunct)
- TOTSE (defunct)
- TomsHardware
- TrekNation
- TripAdvisor
- Two Plus Two

== U ==
- Ubuntu Forums (defunct)
- Ultimate Guitar
- urban75

== V ==
- Veggieboards
- Voat (defunct)

== W ==
- Websleuths
- The Whole Earth 'Lectronic Link (The WELL)
- Whirlpool.net.au
- Wowhead
- Wrong Planet

== Y ==
- Yahoo Groups (defunct)

== Z ==
- Zhihu (知乎)

== See also ==
- Comparison of internet forum software
- Comparison of Q&A sites
- Forum spam
- Lists of websites
