= Prune (disambiguation) =

A prune is a dried fruit of various plum species.

Prune may also refer to:

- Pruning, the practice of removing undesired portions from a plant
- Prune fingers, the wrinkling of skin after immersion in water
- Prune Nourry, a French artist working in New York
- Prune (video game), a 2015 video game awarded Time magazine's game of the year

== See also ==
- Prunus, a genus of fruit trees
- Pruning (disambiguation)
- PPRuNe, an Internet forum for airline pilots etc. in the aviation industry
- Prune plum, a plum subspecies used for making prunes
