= VN-Zoom =

- Website type: Computer and Technology Forum
- Available in: Vietnamese
- Owner: Dinh Quang Vinh
- Creator: PeMit#1
- Website: vn-z.vn
- Commercial: No
- Registration: Optional (Note: Registration is required for certain tasks such as creating a new topic, creating a new article in a topic, and viewing web links)
- Users: Admin Vn-Z.vn
- Launched: August 3, 2020
- Written in: vBulletin for vn-zoom.com XenForo for vn-z.vn

VN-Zoom was a public, free-access internet forum based in Vietnam. The new active version is vn-z.vn (vn-zoom.org) Old version is vn-zoom.com that shut down on November 5, 2018.

== Creation ==
Vn-Zoom.com was created by admin Pemit . New version is Vn-Z.vn (VN-Zoom) was administrated by Dinh Quang Vinh, and was created in 2015 using the Internet forum software Xenforo. Vn-Z.vn (Vn-Zoom.org) has a social network license issued by the Ministry of Information and Communications of Vietnam on September 13, 2019

== Content ==
VN-Zoom was a forum for computing and technology. It had information on Windows, computer hardware, video games and mobile phones. Previously, VN-Zoom was also famous for uploading pirated software. VN-Zoom then transformed into a forum for technology news, with tips on information technology and reviews of technological equipment.

== Access and limits ==
VN-Zoom was public and accessible to everyone on the Internet from Vietnam. Only registered users were able to do certain tasks, such as creating new topics and articles. New users lacked access to some advanced features of the forum, such as creating a new topic or thanking a person on the forum. Vn-Zoom has been under DDoS attack for a long time in 2020, so the forum often has to block international IPs to prevent DDoS attacks.

== Rules ==
=== Basic rules ===
VN-Zoom had strict rules. Users who were found to violate the rules were removed.

=== Spam, violations and bans ===
Like many forums on the Internet, users could spam or create topics or articles that violated the rules of the forum easily. If moderators or administrators saw topics and identified spam or prohibited topics or articles, they would delete the offending topic or article and ban the user. Normal users could also report a spam article or prohibited topic or article to the moderator. The moderator would review the report and assess whether the reported topic or article was indeed spam or prohibited. If it was spam, or in violation of the rules of the forum, the offending user was banned. The bans varied in length, depending on the seriousness of the violation. Sometimes the bans were permanent.

== Social network license ==
Vn-Z.vn (Vn-Zoom.org) is currently operating under the Social Network establishment license No. 386 / GP-BTTTT, Signed on: September 13, 2019. Responsible for the content: Dinh Quang Vinh

== Legal issues ==
=== File sharing ===
VN-Zoom.com gained notoriety for hosting unauthorized copies of software, games, and films. This content was shared by users on the forum and could be downloaded easily. Because of this, VN-Zoom.com received several DMCA copyright claims from software publishers. Vn-Z.vn (VN-zoom.org) has completely blocked the sharing of unlicensed and cracked software on forums

=== Google Search with Vn-Zoom.com ===
VN-Zoom.com was restricted by Google Search for its focus on unlicensed distribution. Google identified VN-Zoom as a malicious website and removed it from its search results. Although Google Search has recently added VN-Zoom back to the search results, and can now be accessed publicly.
