= NamePros =

Online community for domain name investors

- Available in: English
- Founded: January 4, 2003; 23 years ago
- Headquarters: United States
- Owner: Private investor
- Founder: Ron James
- Key people: Edward Zeiden Eric Lyon
- Industry: Domain name speculation
- Services: Forum, marketplace, chat, domain sales landing pages
- Website: www.namepros.com
- IPv6 support: No
- Registration: Optional; required for participation
- Users: around 1 million (self-reported)
- Launched: February 2003; 23 years ago
- Current status: Online

NamePros is an online community for domain name investors. Its services include discussion forums, a domain name marketplace, and domain sales landing pages.

NamePros was founded by Ron James in 2003. In January 2012, domain parking company Bodis acquired NamePros.

== History ==
Ron "RJ" James publicly launched NamePros in February, 2003. He created NamePros to fill the hole left by Afternic, a popular online community that was quickly failing. NamePros started to see success around June, 2003, four months after its launch. Ron James dismissed the idea of adopting a subscription business model, favoring free services.

=== Acquisition by Bodis ===
Bodis, a domain parking company, acquired NamePros in January 2012, and the acquisition was publicly confirmed later that month by Bodis owner Matt Wegrzyn. Wegrzyn stated that improvements to the website and its services would follow and that Bodis would continue to keep NamePros an open community.

On May 14, 2013, NamePros released a series of updates to its service, including a new layout and the addition of a domain sales history tool. The new tool, developed by a community member, scraped domain sale information from other websites and RSS feeds. According to the announcement, the tool indexed over 80,000 sales that members could query.

=== Ownership Change (2013) ===
NamePros changed ownership again in July, 2013.

In May, 2014, NamePros released another series of updates. They migrated from vBulletin to XenForo, resulting in significant changes. DNForum, a competing website, made a similar update a month prior.

By the mid-2010s, industry coverage described NamePros as the primary forum for domain investors, as older competitors declined. Domain Name Wire wrote that NamePros had been the "go-to place" to discuss domains with peers, and later noted that DNForum was "supplanted by NamePros" and went offline in 2016.

=== April Fools' Day activities ===
NamePros has periodically marked April Fools' Day with humorous forum-based pranks and parody features directed at its domain industry audience. In 2018, TLD Investors wrote that NamePros had been participating in April Fools' Day activities annually for the previous four years, describing it as an ongoing tradition and summarizing pranks carried out in 2015, 2016, 2017, and 2018. These activities typically take the form of parody feature announcements and satirical posts published on April 1 within the forum.

In 2024, Domain Name Wire reported on one such April 1 announcement related to NamePros' domain sales landing pages platform.

== Services ==
=== Forum for domain investors ===
NamePros provides forums for domain investors. Namecheap has described NamePros as a “go-to” forum for domain name investors where users discuss purchases, seek appraisals, and buy and sell domain names. The service implements a freemium model: typical use is free, but users can purchase additional features on a subscription basis.

=== Domain name marketplace ===
As part of its forums, NamePros provides a domain name marketplace, where users can buy and sell domain names. The marketplace combines various models, including auctioning, fixed price, and bargaining. Domains considered particularly valuable can be listed in a dedicated area.

A 2021 Namecheap guide described the NamePros marketplace as organized into categories (for example, numeric, brandable, and traffic domains) and using thread-based listings, including fixed-price sales, auctions, and offer-based formats.

Around 2008, NamePros also offered live auctions.

=== Domain sales landing pages ===
In April 2023, NamePros launched NamePros Parking, a free service that allows users to point domain names to “for sale” landing pages and route inquiries to the seller. In 2024, NamePros added an optional fixed-price workflow that can require buyers to confirm an email address before viewing the price, allowing sellers to capture lead information while offering a “buy now” option. In August 2024, NamePros introduced custom short and long descriptions for its landing pages.

=== Domain search and for-sale domain promotion ===
In April 2026, Domain Name Wire reported that NamePros had added domain-search functionality to help surface aftermarket domain names listed through NamePros Parking. The feature allowed visitors to search for domain names and receive suggestions of aftermarket domains for sale. Domains added to the platform could also appear in dynamic advertisements on NamePros and on a NamePros tab at ExpiredDomains.net. Logged-in users could view Whois information, and NamePros planned to add NameBio sales-history data to the search tool.

=== Domain investor chat room ===
In May, 2014, NamePros revived its online chat service for domain investors. It had offered a chat service previously, but it had been discontinued. Initial reception was positive.

== Reception ==
GoDaddy has listed NamePros among domain investor resources, describing it as providing updates, industry information, forums, and news.

A 2025 Hostinger guide on domain flipping recommended joining domain-related forums such as NamePros and DNForum to seek advice and discuss strategy and valuation. A 2026 guide published by Name.com recommended promoting domain listings on domain forums such as NamePros.

In 2018, several technology publications cited NamePros reporting in coverage of DuckDuckGo’s acquisition of Duck.com from Google, including The Verge, TechCrunch, and Gizmodo.

In a 2024 report about the domain registrar Epik, Wired described NamePros as a domain-name forum used by domain-industry professionals (“domainers”).

== See also ==
- List of Internet forums
