= Literotica =

Free erotic fiction website

- Website type: Erotic fiction literature
- Owners: Sunlane Media, LLC
- Website: www.literotica.com
- Registration: Optional
- Launched: 1998; 28 years ago
- Current status: Live

Literotica (a portmanteau of "literature" and "erotica") is a free erotic fiction website. It allows any user to register as an author and submit stories.

It has over 2.5 million registered users as of December 2025. Amateur authors contribute stories, poems, essays, illustrated stories, and audio stories in a variety of categories.

As of December 2025, more than 100,000 authors and 500,000 erotic stories have been posted, and the site allows stories to be posted in several different languages.

As of December 2025, it had 50 million visitors per month. In addition to written works, the site includes erotic audio and a store page.

== Ownership ==
The Literotica trademark is owned by Sunlane Media LLC, a digital agency from Nevada, USA.

== Story submission ==
Literotica is among the first adult sites open to story creators, having replaced the Usenet erotic story sections. Its few rules prohibit stories about pedophilia and bestiality (except that involving fantasy creatures such as dragons and unicorns), and it is mostly aimed at amateur writers and readers who prefer a largely image-free environment. Stories include short, one-off stories, chain stories written in collaboration with other authors, and entire novels submitted in a "chapter-by-chapter" mode.

The stories themselves are categorized by various themes. Categories exist for stories with pictures and stories with audio, as well as for stories that do not actually feature erotic content.

== Message boards ==
Literotica's forum has over 2.4 million registered members, as of March 2023. Users can participate in 52 fora, consisting of 38 English-speaking and 14 non-English-speaking language boards. Topics include "Amateur Pic Feedback", "Authors' Hangout", "Online Role Playing", "Poetry Feedback an Discussion", "Sexual Role Playing", "General Board", "How To...", a place for writers to seek feedback on their stories, and BDSM and LGBTQ+ sections.

Members of the message boards sometimes meet in "Litogethers", where members from particular areas plan an event, to socialize with others with whom they have formed online friendships.

After having been on the VBulletin platform since inception, the forum was converted to XenForo in February 2022.

== Literotica chat ==
The site also provides a series of chat rooms. Originally, this service was through DigiChat or Literotica's Java client software, but because of continued cyberattacks, the chat platform moved to a Flash-based client. As of December 2015, it has been operating on a web-based client. Profiles are shared in the story section, and registration is required. Chat registration is free, and users can create their own public rooms. Chat rooms are moderated, and users who discuss forbidden topics are banned from the system.

== LLM training ==
Literotica content has been used by AI/LLM developers to generate content.

== Reception ==
On a list of seven classiest porn sites by Salon, Literotica came fifth. Bustle recommends Literotica for women. Literotica has been used in scientific research, with a study analyzing over 300,000 stories to determine the most popular words in erotic fiction.

== Publications ==
Literotica has published two books containing collections of stories from the website.

- Literotica: The Very Best of Literotica.com (2001)
- Literotica 2: The Very Best of Literotica.com (2009)

== See also ==
- Erotic literature
- List of Internet forums
