= NeoGAF =

Internet forum

- Website type: Internet forum
- Available in: English
- Owners: NeoGaf LLC (100% — Tyler Malka)
- Creator: Jim Cordeira
- Website: neogaf.com
- Commercial: Yes
- Registration: Optional (Note: Registration requires admin approval and is required for creating threads and posting messages.)
- Launched: 1999; 27 years ago (as Gaming-Age Forums)
- Current status: Active
- Written in: PHP, MySQL (powered by XenForo 2.2)

NeoGAF is an Internet forum primarily dedicated to the discussion of video games. Founded as an adjunct to a video game news site under the name Gaming-Age Forums, on April 4, 2006, it changed its name to NeoGAF and became independently hosted and administered.

In 2017, site owner Tyler "Evilore" Malka was accused of sexual harassment. The allegations resulted in moderator resignations, mass exodus off the site and later site policy changes. Former members and moderators would later launch the new forum ResetEra.

== History ==
NeoGAF began as "The Gaming-Age Forums", a forum for gaming website Gaming-Age. As Gaming-Age outgrew its hosting, IGN took over hosting of Gaming-Age's forums. After IGN ceased hosting of GAF in mid-2001, GAF moved to ezboard, and the administration of GAF became more estranged from Gaming-Age.

As the Gaming-Age staff became gradually more divorced from the day-to-day operation of GAF, problems with the new Gamesquad hosting cropped up. As software bugs in vBulletin 2, the version GAF was using at the time, continued to worsen, the Gamesquad hosting became increasingly more impractical, until the forums' database became corrupted, forcing a move to new hosting in order to change software and salvage what was left of the forums' database. In the spring of 2004, a fundraiser was held to move GAF to new hosting. On June 6, 2004, GAF took its newest form (known as NeoGAF to long-time posters) and moved to new hosting and new software, vBulletin 3.

On April 4, 2006, the forums were relaunched as NeoGAF, the former in-moniker, by its administrators. NeoGAF also features its own front page, an upfront admission that the forum's audience had drifted from that of its birthing news site, but yet mandated a single portal to represent the forum's members.

In an interview with VG247 in 2013, Tyler Malka claimed that he was offered $5 million to sell the website, turning down the offer. One year later he stated in a forum post that the offer doubled, later saying he also turned down the deal.

=== Sexual misconduct allegations against Malka, and moderators' exodus ===
On October 21, 2017, film director Ima Leupp described in a Facebook post, as part of the #MeToo movement, a trip she took with NeoGAF owner Tyler "Evilore" Malka two years before. She said that while she and Malka were drinking together in a New Orleans hotel room in April 2015, she became very sick. While cleaning up in the shower, she said he approached her "fully naked" from behind without her consent.

Following the sexual harassment scandal, half of the site's moderation staff resigned, and many users posted "suicide threads" wherein they demanded to be banned from the forum. The website went offline soon after. Afterwards, NeoGAF was restored, suspending the off-topic sections of the board, and announcing that politics would henceforth be a prohibited subject of discussion and that moderation would become anonymous.

== Reception ==
=== Industry response ===
Members of the video games industry have been known to be members of the website, such as David Jaffe and Cliff Bleszinski.

In 2007, in a thread discussing the resignation of Peter Moore from Microsoft, one user making fun of Microsoft's vice president of global marketing Jeff Bell received a personal message asking them "And your contribution to society is ... what?" The account was later found to be Jeff Bell's. Malka later said he saw a shift on the forums with people in the games industry being more careful of what they post.

In a 2009 thread post on NeoGAF dedicated to the game Scribblenauts, user "Feep" relayed the experience of discovering during E3 that he was able to go back in time with a time machine to collect a dinosaur in order to defeat an army of robot zombies that could not be defeated with regular weapons. The story, memorialized as "Post 217", led to the games artist Edison Yan creating a desktop wallpaper image of the story, in appreciation of the positive fan response to the game, and the terms "Post Two One Seven", "Feep", and "Neogaf" were included as summonable objects in the game. Scribblenauts' director Jeremiah Slaczka credited the word-of-mouth popularity of "Post 217" for part of the game's success at E3, and noted that he had contacted Feep to gain his permission to include "Feep" (appearing as a robot zombie) within the game.

Describing the development struggles of 2017's Rime, Tequila Works co-founder Raúl Rubio Munárriz said that reading the forum's reactions reduced him to tears for two days and that if he had read them early on in development, the game would have been cancelled. "Partly because I just don't understand the cruelty, but more importantly because I could see those years over those two days, and I began to understand that maybe people can love something so much that they can hate it."

=== Criticism ===
One of the biggest critics of NeoGAF was game designer and former Silicon Knights president Denis Dyack. In June 2008, he issued a challenge to forum users. He asked users to say whether they were for or against the then upcoming Silicon Knights game Too Human. Once the game was released, if the game received negative reception, Dyack would have "Owned by GAF" under his forum name. If positive reception, users who voted against the game would have had "Owned by Too Human." Dyack would later go on the 1UP Yours podcast, explaining his challenge was an experiment to expose the lack of accountability on online forums, adding that NeoGAF would crumble if it doesn't reform itself. He was later permanently banned from the site in August that same year after calling it the worst online forum.

By the mid-2010s, NeoGAF was criticized for biased moderation widely seen as favoring progressive, left-wing politics and Sony products, while banning political dissidents and others who did not agree with the moderators. Tyler "Evilore" Malka made a post admitting biased moderation by at least one former member of the moderation staff. Malka stated that the ex-moderator banned hundreds of members without justification. Malka also made the declaration that discussion should be encouraged with different points of view, saying that people on the website have been "driven out, character assassinated, labeled traitor for not sounding angry enough, or for not being entirely on board with ostracizing someone else for the same reasons."

=== In the media ===
In 2007, the website partnered up with The Get-Well Gamers Foundation to launch a donation campaign to bring video games to children in hospitals. NeoGAF raised $5,600 in cash and inventory donations over the October to December period.

An exchange on the forum inspired members to start the development of Dudebro II in 2010. The game was intended to be a satirical take on the machismo found in some modern titles and was planned to feature Jon St. John, the voice of Duke Nukem, as the lead. The team's last statement, in late 2017, disassociated the game from NeoGAF due to the sexual harassment controversy, claiming a new and unrelated team would be created to continue development.

In June 2015, a Reddit sub-community devoted towards mocking NeoGAF became one of five communities shut down by the site. Reddit argued the ban hit groups "that allow their communities to use the subreddit as a platform to harass individuals when moderators don’t take action."

Vice News noted the site was one of the largest drivers of traffic to Hillary Clinton's website during the 2016 U.S. presidential election.

=== ResetEra ===
Several former NeoGAF members established ResetEra on October 24, 2017, after NeoGAF's owner, Tyler Malka faced sexual misconduct accusations. From November 2017 to March 2018, ResetEra hosted Q&A sessions with Insomniac Games, Chucklefish, LizardCube, DotEmu, and Tom Happ and Dan Adelman, the creators of Axiom Verge.

ResetEra moderators enacted the site's first game ban by barring all promotion of the game Hogwarts Legacy, citing a "far-right" YouTube channel run by then-lead designer Troy Leavitt, and transphobic comments made by author J. K. Rowling. In January 2023, the ban was extended to include any discussion of the game.

In October 2021, ResetEra was purchased for 4.5 million dollars by MOBA Network, a Swedish company that focuses on managing web-based forums for video games and esports. In a statement, MOBA Network claimed that it wants to "increase advertising revenue through a higher share of direct sales, implementation of new ad formats, and a long-term product development strategy."

Game developers and journalists have visited the forums, including journalist Geoff Keighley; Cory Barlog, creative director at Santa Monica Studio; James Stevenson, the Community Director for Insomniac Games; and Thomas Mahler, director of Moon Studios; among others.

== See also ==
- List of Internet forums
