= Miestai.net =

Urban development internet forum website

- Website type: Forum
- Registration: Optional
- Users: 11,000+ (2024)
- Launched: 30 July 2004; 22 years ago

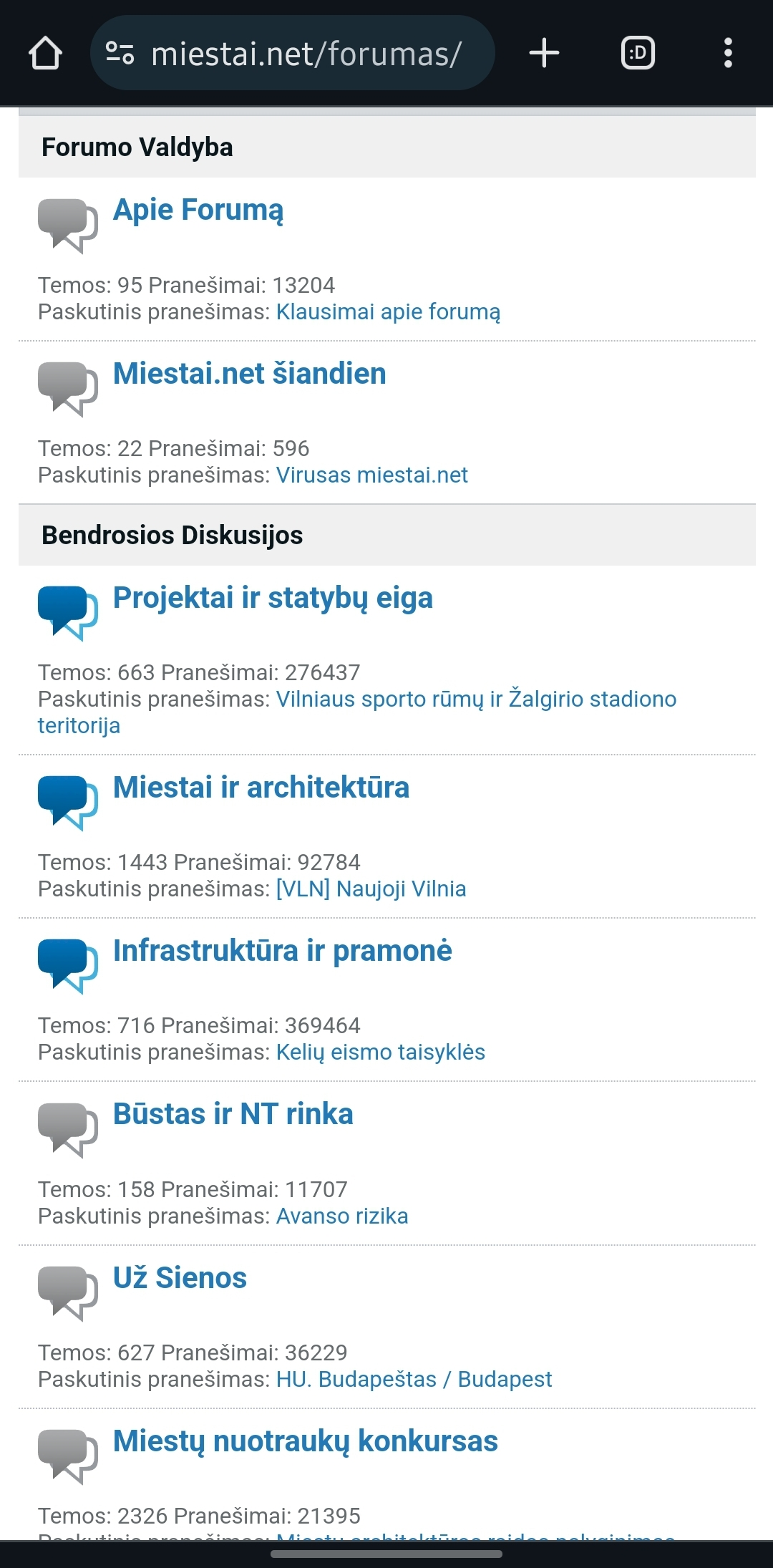
Mobile screenshot of the forum (2024)

Miestai.net, also known as Forumas Miestai, is Lithuania's largest online forum on construction and urban development. The forum was created in 2004 and is hosted in Vilnius.

The site consists of discussions, photos and factual information about various construction projects and plans added to the forum by its volunteers. Despite that many facts on the site are not vetted, news organizations quote forum users and use their photos in news articles. Members of miestai.net are known to offer ideas and suggestions to various urban developments in Lithuania.

The forum is also used to discuss and evaluate housing purchases.

== Effect on the Lithuanian language ==
VLKK, the official language regulating body of the Lithuanian language, has used examples from miestai.net when evaluating potential inclusions of new words to the Lithuanian language.

== See also ==
- Emporis
- SkyscraperPage
- SkyscraperCity
- Council on Tall Buildings and Urban Habitat
