= Helsinki Challenge =

Helsinki Challenge is a science-based competition and idea accelerator which brings together the academic community and society at large to solve the world's grand challenges in cooperation. The competition goal is not only to create new scientific information, but to influence society.

Multidisciplinary teams consisting of experts from the academic and artistic communities, the business world, the public and third sectors, media and other actors of the society are welcome to take part in the competition. Participating teams are evaluated by the jury using the following criteria: originality, creativity, impact, focus on solutions and use of science-based methods. The competition prize is 375,000 euros and it is meant for the implementation of the solution.

Helsinki Challenge was held for the first time in 2015. In 2017, the competition is organised by the University of Helsinki in collaboration with Aalto University, Hanken School of Economics, University of Eastern Finland, University of Jyväskylä, University of Oulu, University of the Arts Helsinki, University of Turku, University of Vaasa and Åbo Akademi University.

== Helsinki Challenge 2014–2015 ==
The first ever Helsinki Challenge was organised by the University of Helsinki and celebrated the University's 375th anniversary in 2015. The first Helsinki Challenge competition themes were: environmental change, health and wellbeing, future learning, global Helsinki and new world view.

=== Semifinal 2014–2015 ===
Out of 80 proposals, a list of 20 semifinalists were announced in December 2014. Teams’ competition ideas ranged from developing tools to analyze big data on the Finnish discussion forum Suomi24 to studying our expectations of robot morality.

==== Semifinalist teams ====
Future Organization, team leader Veikko Eranti
Climate Whirl, team leader Eija Juurola
Sustainability tracker, team leader Kaisa Korhonen-Kurki
Play Learn Heal, team leader Kristiina Kumpulainen
Moralities of Intelligent Machines, team leader Michael Laakasuo
The Citizen Mindscapes, team leader Krista Lagus
Ground and Growth, team leader Kristina Lindström
Engaging Future Workplace, team leader Kirsti Lonka
Lab Impact Africa, team leader Christina Lyra
Higher Education Unbounded, team leader Katalin Miklossy
Urban Academy, team leader Jari Niemelä
Tell Us, team leader Maria Niemi
Biodiversity Now, team leader Markku Ollikainen
Helsinki Sleep Factory, team leader Anu-Katriina
Viewfinder, team leader Paavo Pylkkänen
SafePreg – Health into Next Generation, team leader Katri Räikkönen
NEMO - Natural Emotionality in Digital Interaction, team leader Katri Saarikivi
Generation Green, team leader Tiina Sikanen
The Happiness Project, team leader Laura Visapää
Genetic Correction of Inherited Hemoglobin Disease, team leader Kirmo Wartiovaara

=== Final 2014–2015 ===
In October 2015, the five finalist teams were chosen: Moralities of Intelligent Machines, Biodiversity Now, Helsinki Sleep Factory, SafePreg – Health into Next Generation and NEMO - Natural Emotionality in Digital Interaction. The jury for the final included Chancellor Thomas Wilhelmsson (chair), Pro-Vice Chancellor of Education Sally Mapstone from the University of Oxford, Professor of Practice Pasi Sahlberg from Harvard University’s Harvard Graduate School of Education, Director Ulrich Weinberg from the Hasso Plattner Institute School of Design Thinking and President Mikko Kosonen of the Finnish Innovation Fund SITRA.

==== Winner teams ====
The €375,000 prize for the science-based idea competition Helsinki Challenge was divided between two teams. The winner was NEMO – Natural Emotionality in Digital Interaction, which received €250,000, while the runner-up, Biodiversity Now, received €125,000. The prize money is intended for realising the team's idea.

NEMO is developing new ways to digitise and transmit emotion online. The team is planning small add-ons for digital interaction platforms that would consider emotions. This way participants in online discussions could see or even experience the emotions of others in a new way that would be equivalent to natural interaction. The team wants to create an open protocol for emotion transmission for any coder to use for building new empathy-enabling applications.

Biodiversity Now team wants to establish a Finnish habitat bank so that, for example, companies reducing biodiversity through a construction project could offset this by increasing biodiversity elsewhere.

== Helsinki Challenge 2016–2017 ==
The second Helsinki Challenge was kicked off in August 2016. The winner will be announced in conjunction with the centennial of Finland's independence in 2017. The new Helsinki Challenge themes: Sustainable Plant, Urban Future and People in Change are linked to the United Nations' Sustainable Development Goals. The intention is to create solutions for future wellbeing through cooperation with a range of different institutions.
