= SkyscraperCity =

Urban development internet forum website

- Website type: Forum
- Owner: VerticalScope
- Creator: Jan Klerks
- Registration: Optional
- Users: 950,000+
- Launched: 11 September 2002; 24 years ago

SkyscraperCity, also known as SkyscraperCity.com, is the world's largest online forum on skyscrapers and urban related topics. The website, which currently runs on XenForo, was founded in 2002 by Dutch economist Jan Klerks running on vBulletin, in order to share and solicit comment on urban development in Rotterdam. It gradually expanded to include other city and country subforums, eventually encompassing the entire world.

As of 2019, the forum has over 1 million members, 1 million threads and over 110 million posts. By some measures, it was considered the largest online forum in the world in 2010 or largest online bulletin board in the world. In 2009, the forum attracted more than 500,000 unique visitors daily. In 2018, SkyscraperCity was acquired by VerticalScope and the forum was migrated from vBulletin to XenForo in 2020.

== Volunteers ==
The site works by allowing members to add photos and other details to the website. Although many facts on the site are not vetted, news organizations quote the users on the website. The photos uploaded by volunteers are often used in news articles.

== See also ==
- Emporis
- SkyscraperPage
- Structurae
- Council on Tall Buildings and Urban Habitat
