= Dudebro =

Dudebro is most often a parody of the term "dude". It may also refer to:

- Dudebro II, an unreleased video game
- Dude Bro Party Massacre III, a 2015 satirical film
