= Libervis Network =

The Libervis Network is a network of websites related to free culture. The name comes from the Latin adverb meaning "most freely" (continuing from libervor meaning "more freely" and liberv meaning "freely").

== Libervis.com ==
Libervis.com, founded in June 2004 as a free software community center, is now a site about the philosophical aspects of free culture. It uses Internet forums, essays, news and a wiki to discuss this.

In June 2008, Libervis.com was relaunched as a project for technology enthusiasts interested in building freedom with the core topic being the advances of technology and the way its use affects individual freedom today and in the future.

== Nuxified.org ==
Nuxified.org is a free software technical support site with forums, blogging (about free software only) and articles (usually tutorials or software reviews). It was founded in response to LinuxForums.org switching its forum software from the free phpBB to the non-free vBulletin after being bought out in December 2005. Common users of Libervis.com and LinuxForums.org felt that was hypocritical and set a bad example for a FOSS site.

In July 2006, Nuxified started a partnership with GetGNULinux.org. Nuxified hosts forums for discussing GetGNULinux.org. In August 2006, Nuxified started a similar partnership with PolishLinux.org.
