= College Confidential =

College Confidential may refer to:

- College Confidential (company), a college admissions counseling company founded in 2001
- College Confidential (film), a 1960 B-movie drama
