= Mario Williams =

American football player (born 1985)

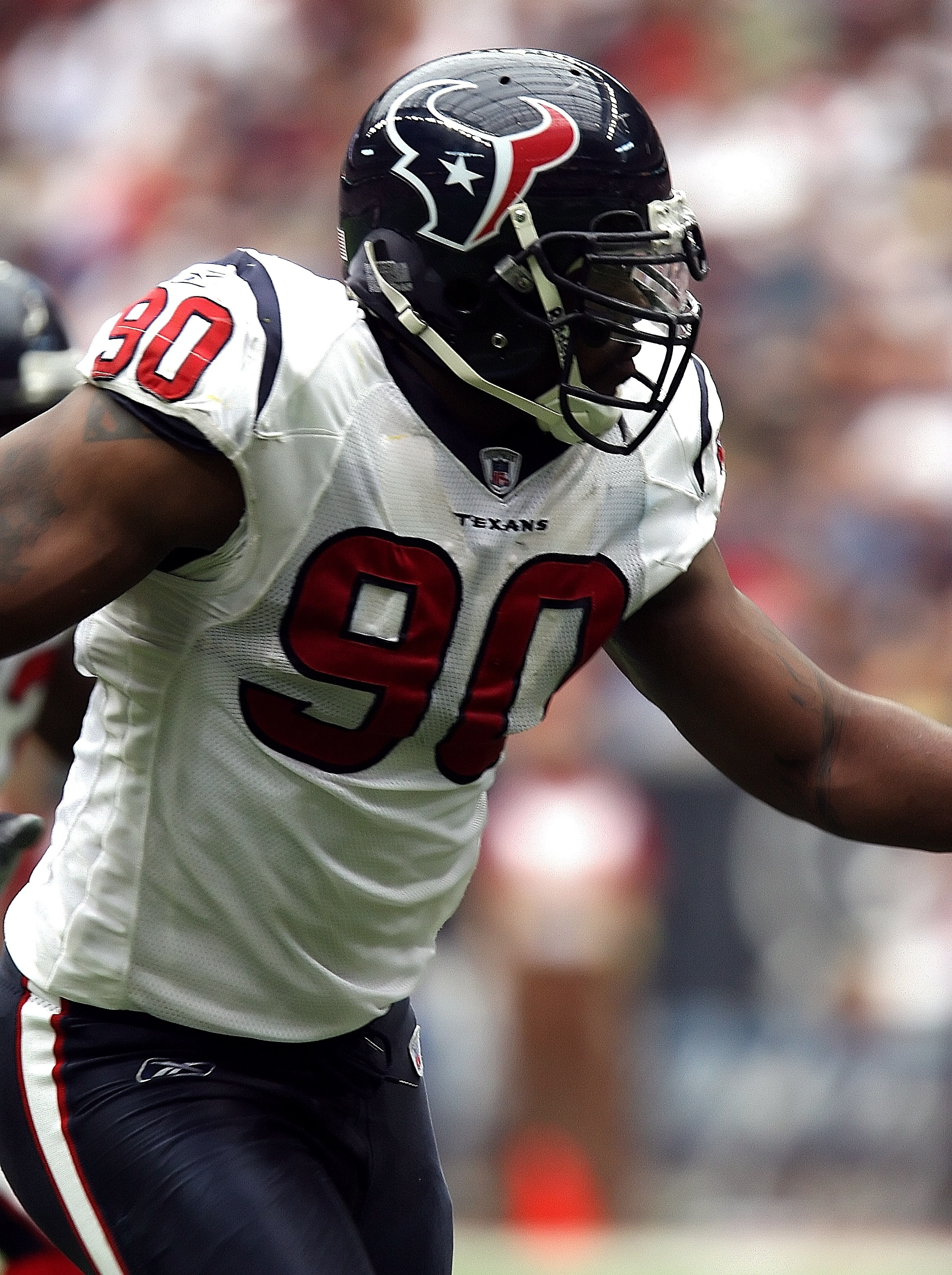
- Williams with the Houston Texans in 2006

No. 90, 94
- Position: Defensive end

Personal information
- Born: January 31, 1985 (age 41); Richlands, North Carolina, U.S.
- Listed height: 6 ft 6 in (1.98 m)
- Listed weight: 300 lb (136 kg)

Career information
- High school: Richlands
- College: NC State (2003–2005)
- NFL draft: 2006: 1st round, 1st overall pick

Career history
- Houston Texans (2006–2011); Buffalo Bills (2012–2015); Miami Dolphins (2016)

Awards and highlights
- 2× First-team All-Pro (2008, 2014); 2× Second-team All-Pro (2007, 2013); 4× Pro Bowl (2008, 2009, 2013, 2014); NFL Alumni Defensive Lineman of the Year (2007); Third-team All-American (2005); 2× First-team All-ACC (2004, 2005); NC State Wolfpack Jersey No. 9 honored

Career NFL statistics
- Total tackles: 399
- Sacks: 97.5
- Forced fumbles: 16
- Fumble recoveries: 5
- Pass deflections: 21
- Defensive touchdowns: 1
- Stats at Pro Football Reference

Mario Jerrel Williams (born January 31, 1985) is an American former professional football player who was a defensive end in the National Football League (NFL). He played college football for the NC State Wolfpack, and was selected first overall by the Houston Texans in the 2006 NFL draft. A four-time Pro Bowl selection, he also played for the Buffalo Bills and Miami Dolphins.

== Early life ==
Williams attended Richlands High School in Richlands, North Carolina, where he was a two-sport star in football and track. He recorded 87 tackles, 13 sacks, 22 tackles for loss, five forced fumbles, two fumble recoveries, and five blocked kicks as a senior. He also played running back as a senior, because of injuries at that position, rushing for 590 yards and three touchdowns on 58 carries. As a junior, he recorded over 100 tackles.

He was selected to the 2002 North Carolina Shrine Bowl team where he notched four sacks. He was an Associated Press (AP) All-State selection in 2002. He was just one of three North Carolina High School players to be named to FoxSN's 2002 Countdown to Signing Day All-South team. His high school number (82) was retired at Richlands High School. In track & field, he was a state qualifier in the shot put with a top-throw of 52-5 or 16.05m.

He was ranked No. 8 in SuperPrep's Elite 50 overall. He was considered the fifth-best defensive end in the country by BorderWars.com, while Rivals100.com ranked him ninth.

== College career ==
Williams attended North Carolina State University, where he played for the NC State Wolfpack from 2003 to 2005. In only three seasons on the team he set the school's all-time sack record, a record which stood until 2017, when it was broken by Bradley Chubb, a player in his fourth season with the team.

== Professional career ==
Pre-draft measurables
Height	Weight	Arm length	Hand span	40-yard dash	10-yard split	20-yard split	20-yard shuttle	Three-cone drill	Vertical jump	Broad jump	Bench press
6 ft 7 in (2.01 m)	295 lb (134 kg)	34 1/8 in (0.87 m)	10 1/4 in (0.26 m)	4.71 s	1.59 s	2.75 s	4.36 s	7.19 s	40.5 in (1.03 m)	10 ft 0 in (3.05 m)	35 reps
All values from NFL Combine

=== Houston Texans ===
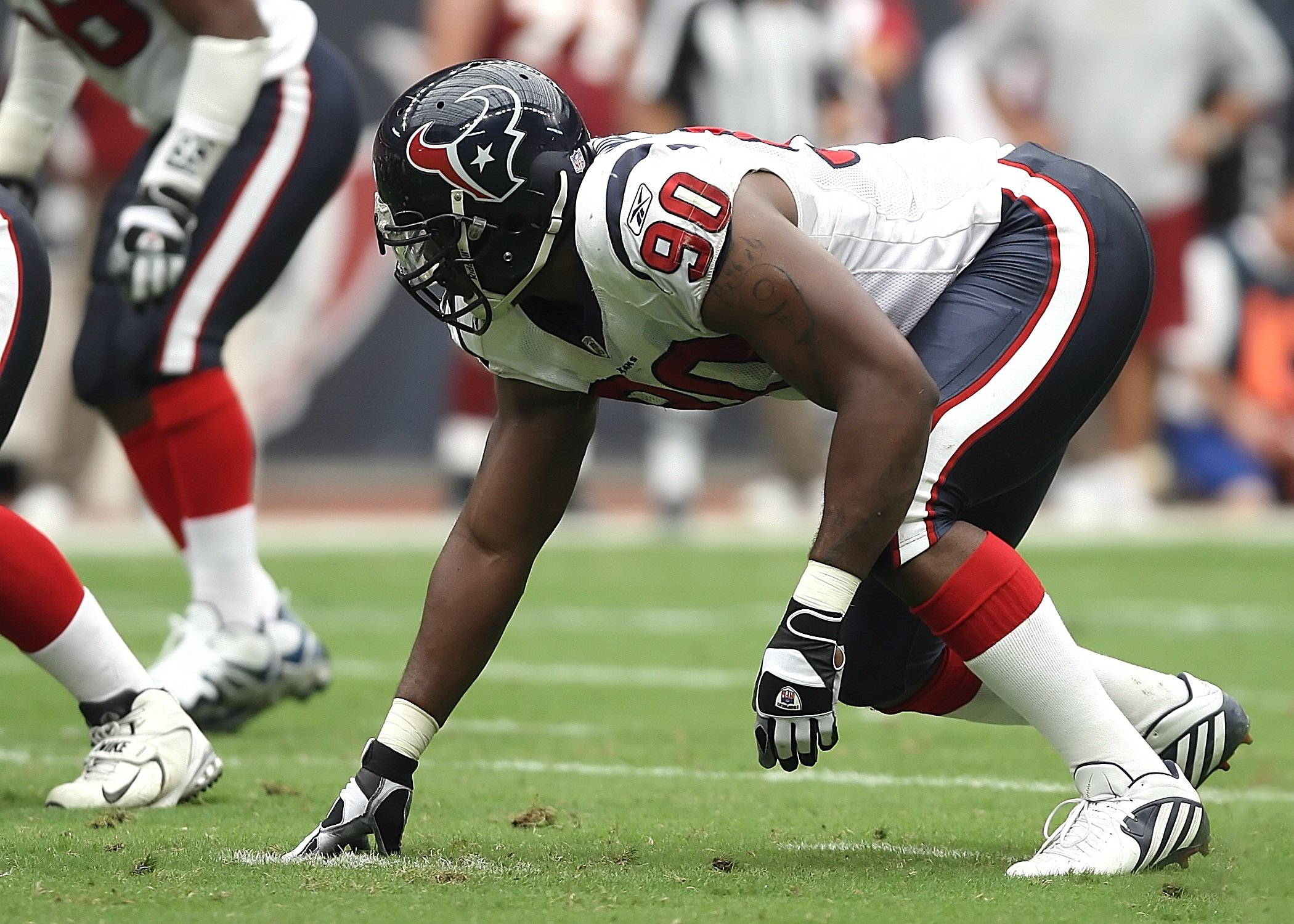
Williams with the Texans in 2006

Despite draft analysts predicting that the Houston Texans would pick Reggie Bush with the first overall pick in the 2006 NFL draft, they instead selected Williams and signed him to a six-year, $54 million contract.

On October 1, 2006, Williams recorded his first sack and a half against Miami Dolphins' quarterback Daunte Culpepper in the Texans' first win of the season (score 17–15). Three weeks later, Williams sacked Jacksonville Jaguars quarterback Byron Leftwich and recovered a fumble in the Texans' 27–7 upset. In the 2006 season, Williams started all 16 games with 47 tackles, 4.5 sacks, and 1 forced fumble.

Early in the 2007 season, Williams played well, with an outstanding performance in the first game. Williams made five tackles, two sacks, and returned a fumble by Kansas City Chiefs fullback Kris Wilson for a touchdown. He had particularly big games against the Denver Broncos and Tennessee Titans, sacking quarterback Jay Cutler 3.5 times and quarterback Vince Young 2.5 times in one game each. His first sack of 2007 was of Peyton Manning. Before the game, Indianapolis Colts coach Tony Dungy compared Williams to Colts Pro Bowl defensive end Dwight Freeney. Williams finished the 2007 season by starting all 16 games with 59 total tackles and 14 sacks.

The 2007 season was a year that Williams answered many of the critics that he gained because of his lofty top draft pick status. In 2007, through 15 games, Williams accounted for 48 percent of the Texans' sacks, a higher percentage than any other player. Williams was a first-team All-Pro selection by the Sporting News. Williams was not elected to the Pro Bowl game, but was voted an alternate to the game.

In 2008, Williams amassed 12 sacks and 53 tackles in 16 games (all starts). This effort included three sacks and one forced fumble in the Texans' first ever Monday Night Football game on December 1, 2008. For his efforts, Williams was selected for his first Pro Bowl as a starter and was a first-team All-Pro selection by the Sporting News for the second consecutive season. Williams was again selected to the Pro Bowl after the 2009 season.

On December 15, 2010, the Texans announced they were placing Williams on injured reserve for the remainder of the season with an inflamed hernia. Williams had been struggling since September with injuries, though he still ranked in the top third in the NFL in sacks with 8.5 through 13 games. He was ranked 71st by his fellow players on the NFL Top 100 Players of 2011.

In 2011, Williams transitioned to outside linebacker. During Week 5 against the Oakland Raiders, Williams suffered a torn pectoral muscle while sacking Raiders quarterback Jason Campbell for his team-leading fifth sack. On October 12, the Texans placed Williams on injured reserve for the second consecutive year, ending his season. Williams's contract ended in 2011 and he became a free agent, able to sign with any other football team.

==== Texans franchise records ====
- Second most career sacks (53), surpassed on December 21, 2014, by J. J. Watt.
- Second most career forced fumbles (11), surpassed on November 30, 2014, by J. J. Watt.

=== Buffalo Bills ===
On March 15, 2012, after two days of negotiation with the Buffalo Bills, Williams signed a six-year contract worth up to $100 million ($49.5 million guaranteed), which made it the most lucrative contract for a defensive player in NFL history at the time. On May 22, 2012, it was announced that Williams would be wearing number #94 while with the Bills. The #90 that he wore with the Texans was worn by veteran defensive end Chris Kelsay in Buffalo.

Williams started all 16 games in 2012, making 46 tackles, 10.5 sacks, and 2 forced fumbles. He had a season-high 3 sacks against the Colts on November 25, 2012. During the season, Williams was often bothered by a wrist injury which supposedly affected his play.

On September 15, 2013, Williams had 4.5 sacks in a winning effort against the Carolina Panthers, which broke the Bills franchise record for the most sacks in a game. He finished the 2013 season with 38 tackles, a forced fumble, 4 passes defended, and 13 sacks in 16 starts. He finished the 2014 season with 42 total tackles (36 solo, 6 assisted), and 14.5 sacks. On January 2, 2015, he was named to the 2014 AP All-Pro First-team, as well as the 2015 Pro Bowl.

The Bills hired Rex Ryan as their head coach the next season, and Williams was outspoken in his disdain for the scheme Ryan installed, mainly complaining about how he did not want to drop back into coverage. His effort noticeably declined, and he registered only 5.0 sacks.

On March 1, 2016, Williams was released by the Bills.

=== Miami Dolphins ===
On March 8, 2016, the Miami Dolphins signed Williams to a two-year, $17 million contract with $11.98 million guaranteed and a $4 million signing bonus.

On February 16, 2017, after only one season with the team where he recorded just 1.5 sacks, Williams was released by the Dolphins.

== NFL career statistics ==
Legend
**Bold**	Career high

Year	Team	GP	Tackles				Fumbles				PD
Year	Team	GP	Cmb	Solo	Ast	Sck	FF	FR	Yds	TD	PD
2006	HOU	16	47	35	12	4.5	1	1	0	0	3
2007	HOU	16	**59**	43	**16**	14.0	2	1	**38**	**1**	1
2008	HOU	16	53	**44**	9	12.0	**4**	0	0	0	0
2009	HOU	16	43	38	5	9.0	2	1	0	0	3
2010	HOU	13	28	22	6	8.5	1	0	0	0	2
2011	HOU	5	11	10	1	5.0	1	0	0	0	1
2012	BUF	16	46	37	9	10.5	2	**2**	0	0	**4**
2013	BUF	16	38	28	10	13.0	1	0	0	0	**4**
2014	BUF	16	42	36	6	**14.5**	2	0	0	0	2
2015	BUF	15	19	15	4	5.0	0	0	0	0	0
2016	MIA	13	13	9	4	1.5	0	0	0	0	1
Total		158	399	317	82	97.5	16	5	38	1	21
Source: ESPN.com

== Personal life ==
In 2010, Williams, an avid boater, commissioned a one-of-a-kind custom wrap on his MasterCraft X80 boat. Williams, Josh Sirlin and MasterCraft Boat Company worked out the details of the boat design through a series of sketches and then a life-size canvas painting. In 2011, Williams donated five Chevrolet Camaros to the Houston Police Department, and in 2013, he made another donation of five Dodge Chargers. In 2012, Williams debuted a honey-toasted oats breakfast cereal called "MariO's", and the proceeds from the sales are intended to be donated to a Buffalo charity supporting children with cancer and their families.

Williams resided in Orchard Park, New York during his time with the Bills, where he bought a 9,389-square-foot (872.3 m^{2}) home for $2 million in 2012.

Williams was occasionally referred to as "Wario Williams" by forum members on websites such as GameFAQs, ClutchFans, and most notably on the popular social media platform Twitter. This included Syracuse.com's Bills writer Ryan Talbot who made mention of the nickname in 2012. This moniker is a hat tip to the popular Nintendo character Wario who is portrayed as having a similar bruising style and relentless demeanor as Williams.

== See also ==
- List of North Carolina State University people
