= PbNation =

- Website type: Internet forum
- Owner: VerticalScope
- Creators: Tony Rieker, Joe Kerber, Jon Knapp
- Website: www.pbnation.com
- Commercial: Yes
- Registration: Optional
- Launched: 2001
- Current status: Active

PbNation is an English language vBulletin v3.6.2 paintball forum.

== General ==
PbNation is an English language vBulletin v3.6.2 paintball forum, which includes paintball field and store directory, a collection of product reviews, a consumer-to-consumer paintball equipment marketplace, a paintball industry news section, and a paintball video content sharing site – all content is user generated. Although the site is focused on the sport of paintball, it also hosts a large "Small Talk" section where paintball players discuss topics that are not directly paintball related.

Splat Magazine awarded PbNation the 2007 "Paintball Web Site of the Year" and credits PbNation for having "played a larger role in the expansion of paintball knowledge than practically any other source in history." SplatXD awarded PbNation the "Paintball Website of the Year" and said, "For as big as our sport is, our media for the most part is poorly produced, has extremely limited reach and does nothing to expand the visibility of the game. PbNation not only smashes all those limitations, they get more visitors per month than practically all of other forms of paintball media combined. With content that is almost 100% user-driven, they've created a community unlikely to ever be challenged in scope or scale." In 2008, the site was credited as having more traffic than all other paintball websites combined.

According to Forbes, PbNation is the "number one paintball fan site", and the Chicago Tribune called it the "ultra popular paintball website" and listed becoming involved in PbNation as number one in their "Tips for Going Pro" about becoming a professional paintball player. Press Enterprises cites PbNation as "the leading paintball forum, helping facilitate everything from equipment reviews to discussions on the world's best paintballers to the organization of games."

In May 2011, PBNation was acquired by CrowdGather. In June 2014, CrowdGather sold PBNation to TorStar owned VerticalScope, who are the current owners of the forum.

== Users ==
Registration is free and users with free accounts have access to standard features such as forum posting, private messages, B/S/T access. Users paying a subscription fee are called Annual Supporting Members (ASM) and gain access to extra features such as increased Private message (PM) capacity, larger avatar, access to a private forum, no wait between posts, and free Gold Ups.

== Small Talk ==
One of the largest forums on the site dedicated to off topic discussion. Small talk brings in a large amount of new users. The administrators frequently talk of "nuking" this forum, but fear shutting this section down will spread the immaturity to other sections.

== See also ==
- List of Internet forums
