= SkyscraperPage =

Website for skyscraper hobbyists and enthusiasts

SkyscraperPage.com
- Website type: Forum
- Available in: English
- Owner: Skyscraper Source Media Inc.
- Creator: Dylan Leblanc
- Website: www.skyscraperpage.com
- Registration: 62,300+
- Launched: 1998 – Present
- Current status: active

SkyscraperPage (Note: Sometimes written as Skyscraper Page.) is a website for skyscraper hobbyists and enthusiasts that tracks existing and proposed skyscrapers around the world. It is owned by Skyscraper Source Media, a supplier of skyscraper diagrams for the publication, marketing, and display industries, and is a publisher of illustrated skyscraper diagram poster products. They are based in Victoria, British Columbia. The site has drawings of skyscrapers, other major macro-engineering projects, and tall structures around the world. The scale of the drawings are one pixel per metre. The images are created using pixel art. Using these diagrams, skyscrapers and other tall structures can be compared. General information is also given about each structure if available, such as the location, the year built, the height and the number of floors. It also hosts a discussion forum for skyscraper enthusiasts, upgraded from vBulletin 3 to XenForo on November 2026. It has 208,245 Structures included in Database, in which 2,060 of S. Paulo, 340 drawn, and a total of 92,831 drawings. Some of only 44.5 % filled.

== See also ==
- SkyscraperCity
- Emporis
- List of Internet forums
- List of tallest buildings in the world
- Structurae
- Council on Tall Buildings and Urban Habitat
