= MozillaZine =

- Website type: Web forum, Wiki
- Available in: English, French, Japanese, Spanish
- Creator: Chris Nelson
- Website: mozillazine.org
- Commercial: No
- Registration: Optional, for posting messages
- Launched: 1 September 1998
- Current status: Operational

MozillaZine is an unofficial Mozilla website that provides information about Mozilla products including Firefox browser, Thunderbird email client, and related software (SeaMonkey, Camino, Calendar and Mobile). The site hosts an active community support internet forum, and a community-driven knowledge base of information about Mozilla products.

== History ==
The site was founded by Chris Nelson on September 1, 1998, just a few months after mozilla.org, which was created on February 23, 1998, and quickly grew in popularity. Improvements were added to the site and it soon moved to the mozillazine.org domain. Originally, the site's main audience was Mozilla developers, both Netscape employees and outsiders, but it soon attracted interested observers and end users.

On November 14, 1998, MozillaZine merged with MozBin, which brought its webmaster, Jason Kersey, on board.

In the beginning of 2001, Chris Nelson phased out his involvement with the site.

In May 2002, Alex Bishop became the site's third member of staff. Alex Bishop became less involved with the site in 2007.

After 2007, MozillaZine was primarily administrated by Jason Kersey.

In 2009, MozillaZine removed news section of the site due to lack of interest and since the open source project was well covered by other sources, including general and computer press. The home page was updated to remove the News and Blogs links. MozillaZine refocused on community software support and advocacy.

On September 20, 2019, site admin Jason Kersey announced his departure from the project and that the MozillaZine forum and knowledge base would go into read-only mode. While the knowledge base did become read-only in 2020, the web forum remained fully operational. Management was transferred to OSUOSL, where MozillaZine was already being hosted, and, after software upgrades in November 2022, the knowledge base has since been restored to full operational status as well.

== See also ==
- mozdev.org
- List of Internet forums
