= Edugeek =

EduGeek
- Website type: Online community
- Founded: 8 June 2005
- Headquarters: Preston, Lancashire, United Kingdom
- Founder: Chris Byers
- Key people: Chris Byers; Shaun Garriock
- Employees: 2
- Website: www.edugeek.net

EduGeek.net is a British-based online peer support community and information portal for IT professionals working in the field of education, operating primarily as an internet forum. Set up by Chris Byers and Ric Charlton in 2005, the site now has 2 full-time paid staff, the founder, Chris Byers, and a webmaster, Shaun Garriock. As of January 2025, the site has more than 109,000 users.

== History ==
EduGeek was set up in 2005 by Chris Byers, an IT Systems manager for Lancashire schools in the United Kingdom, who has since become employed by the site full-time. The website initially used Dragonfly CMS, although this was found to be too restrictive and the site has since moved onto vBulletin. Today, the EduGeek community has a member base in excess of 109,000.

In April 2010, the NAHT released a report looking at the spending behaviours of schools and the way suppliers were taking advantage of them. This report was in part based on posts at Edugeek, where some members had provided accounts of how their schools had been ripped off by some suppliers.

Following the announcement by the UK Government that it was to close Becta, members of EduGeek worked to ensure that the expertise and knowledge available from Becta remained available on other internet sites.

EduGeek has been a regular feature at the BETT show, staffed by volunteers from its membership.

== Operation ==
The website has three Administrators and 18 Moderators, who volunteer personal time to contribute to the community. To help financially, the site has sponsors such as Smoothwall and Promethean Ltd. The site also uses advertisements provided by AdSense to generate income.

=== Membership ===
All of EduGeek's services to its members are provided free. Its members come from all areas of the IT profession. Originally aimed at IT professionals working within the British education sector in the mid-2000s (decade), its membership now consists of IT staff from all over the world in education, health, banking and private sector.

=== Work with Microsoft ===
In February 2011, Microsoft invited 50 members of EduGeek to their Reading Campus to discuss the different topics relating to Microsoft software in an educational environment.

== In the media ==
- In May 2007, Sophos threatened EduGeek with legal action due to criticising posts of one of its members. Shortly after, Sophos apologised for their actions, blaming it on a staff member convincing their legal team to send the threats, rather than a senior management decision.
- In July 2008, the site was put offline due to a hardware issue at their hosting provider, Fasthosts. This downtime lasted several days and lead to angry members emailing the company en-masse to express their displeasure.
