= ATRL =

Pop culture Internet forum

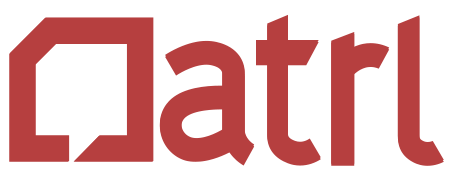
- Screenshot
- Website type: Internet forum
- Available in: English
- Website: atrl.net
- Commercial: Yes
- Registration: Closed (with occasional open periods)
- Users: >32,134 registered users
- Launched: 1999 (as Absolute TRL)
- Current status: Active
- Written in: PHP, MySQL (powered by Invision Community 4.3.5)

ATRL, previously known as Absolute TRL and PopFusion, is an Internet forum that discusses pop culture.

== History ==
Absolute TRL was founded in 1999, as a fan site of MTV's TV Show Total Request Live. In 2005, the main site was closed in favor of the forum. It got renamed to PopFusion in 2006, and retained that name for a year. In 2007, it was renamed to ATRL. Despite the cancelation of Total Request Live in late 2008, it continued operating as a general pop culture forum. In 2017, ATRL gained media attention when a member of the forum discovered hidden artwork, and incomplete tracklist of Taylor Swift's then-upcoming sixth studio album, Reputation (2017), ahead of the official announcement on her website. In a BuzzFeed article on pop fandom culture, ATRL is described as a "space for fans to argue in favor of their chosen artist with statistics and ideas about cultural impact".

== See also ==
- List of Internet forums
