= Emporis =

German real estate data company (1996–2022)

- Type: Subsidiary
- Industry: Real estate
- Founded: 1996; 30 years ago
- Defunct: September 18, 2022
- Headquarters: Hamburg, Germany
- Products: Real estate information
- Parent: CoStar Group
- Website: emporis.com (defunct)

Emporis was a real estate data mining company with headquarters in Hamburg, Germany. The company collected data and photographs of buildings worldwide, which were published in an online database from 2000 to September 2022.

Emporis was acquired by CoStar Group in October 2020. On 12 September 2022, the managing director of CoStar Europe posted a letter on Emporis.com, informing its community members that the Emporis database and community platform would be shut down effective 13 September 2022.

Emporis offered a variety of information on its public database, Emporis.com. Emporis was frequently cited by various media sources as an authority on building data.

Emporis originally focused exclusively on high-rise buildings and skyscrapers, which it defined as buildings "between 35 and 100 metres" tall and "at least 100 metres tall", respectively. Emporis used the point where the building touches the ground to determine height. The database had expanded to include low-rise buildings and other structures. It used a point system to rank skylines.

== History ==
Michael Wutzke started a website about skyscrapers in Frankfurt in 1996. In 2000 he started skyscrapers.com, which was folded into Emporis in 2003.

In 2005, Emporis formed a partnership with the Council on Tall Buildings and Urban Habitat (CTBUH), under which Emporis served as the official CTBUH high-rise buildings database until the launch of The Skyscraper Center in 2011.

In 2007, venture capital firm Neuhaus Partners and KfW Bankengruppe invested several million euros in the company. Effective 1 January 2009, the company moved its headquarters from Darmstadt to Frankfurt. In 2011, the company moved from Frankfurt to Hamburg.

On 26 October 2020, CoStar Group, Inc., based in Washington, D.C., completed its acquisition of Emporis GmbH. CoStar Group added Emporis to its portfolio of brands. The other brands included LoopNet, Apartments.com, Apartment Finder, Belbex, amongst several others.

The merger of Emporis GmbH into CoStar Group subsidiary STR, Inc's German division, STR Germany GmbH, was finalized on 27 January 2021, with Emporis GmbH's removal from the Common Register Portal of the German Federal States (German: gemeinsame Registerportal der Länder).

On 14 September 2022, the entirety of the Emporis website's original content, including the building database, articles and data regarding Emporis Skyscraper Award recipients, and corporate information, was removed.

In 2023, former editors of the Emporis website created a new website called SkyDB, a website that acts with a similar purpose.

== Emporis Skyscraper Award ==
In 2000, a group of Emporis senior editors began presenting the Emporis Skyscraper Award. Eligible buildings are selected from a list of all buildings in the world at least 100 meters tall which were completed that year.

== See also ==
- SkyscraperCity
- SkyscraperPage
- Structurae
- Council on Tall Buildings and Urban Habitat
