= The Student Room =

UK internet forum

The Student Room Group Limited
- Trade name: The Student Room
- Type: Private
- Industry: Student Community, eLearning, Higher Education Marketing
- Predecessor: Acumen Professional Intelligence Limited and Student Media Services Ltd.
- Founded: 1 March 2002; 24 years ago
- Founder: Charles Delingpole
- Headquarters: Brighton, England, U.K.
- Key people: Chris Newson (Chairman); Paul Cernicharo-Terol (Sales Director); Amii Lanham (Commercial Operations Director)
- Owner: Chris Newson, Charles Delingpole + others
- Number of employees: 70
- Website: thestudentroom.co.uk

The Student Room Group (often referred to as TSR) is a UK-based privately held student community company. It owns four major student-facing websites: TheStudentRoom.co.uk, TheUniGuide.co.uk, GetRevising.co.uk and MarkedByTeachers.com and two commercial facing websites: tsrmatters.com and tsrinsight.com.

== History ==
The Student Room forum was created in around 2001 under its original name UK Learning. Launched by Charles Delingpole as a site where students at university could talk to each other, the forum has since developed into a site for all young people. The UK Learning name was changed to The Student Room in late 2004. In 2012, users of The Student Room shared information of leaked SQA exam results.

== Websites ==
=== TheStudentRoom.co.uk ===
The Student Room
- Website type: Student community and social learning site
- Headquarters: United Kingdom
- Owner: The Student Room Group Ltd.
- Founder: Charles Delingpole
- Website: thestudentroom.co.uk

The Student Room (often abbreviated to TSR), established in 1999, is a United Kingdom based community and social learning website for school and university students.

It connects students with other students so that they can make more informed education choices, get help with their studies and get support with student life.

=== TheUniGuide.co.uk ===
The Uni Guide provides advice on the university application process, as well as guides to UK universities and courses. These guides include statistics from a variety of sources including the Higher Education Statistics Agency, the National Student Survey and Longitudinal Education Outcomes. The Uni Guide was formerly Which? University and was acquired by The Student Room Group in February 2020.

=== MarkedbyTeachers.com ===
www.markedbyteachers.com uses selected examples of real student work to help students learn. It has 150,000+ pieces of work written by UK students, of which many are also critiqued by UK teachers or peer-reviewed by students.

=== GetRevising.co.uk ===
www.getrevising.co.uk contains a broad range of supplementary social learning tools including flashcards, quizzes, word searches, mindmaps, crosswords, revision notes, quiz searches and revision cards. Students create their own resources which they can then share with peers.

Get Revising is also home to a study planner and revision timetable creator.

== See also ==
- List of Internet forums
