= Tbilisis Forumi =

- Website type: Internet forum
- Available in: Georgian
- Owner: Temur Khaindrava
- Creator: Temur Khaindrava
- Website: www.forum.ge
- Commercial: Yes (ads)
- Registration: free
- Users: 121710 (8 August 2014)
- Launched: 25 January 2001; 25 years ago
- Current status: active
- Written in: PHP

Tbilisis Forumi (Georgian: თბილისის ფორუმი, "Tbilisi's forum") is the largest and one of the oldest Georgian general-purpose internet forums. It was launched in 2001 by Temur Khaindrava (known by his forum nickname as Tim). In 2004, the administration changed the engine from vBulletin into IPB; At that time the website was visited about 50-100 users each day. In 2007 Tbilisis Forumi became the most popular internet-forum in Georgia, having nearly thousand registered users logged in every day. As of 4 May 2018, the website claims to have 158,220 users and 49,640,102 posts. There are some users of social prominence. Some members were involved in social activities.

== Incidents ==
In April 2016, a court in Tbilisi placed Sulkhan Tsuladze, under the name SPLIYVI (Georgian for "baby elephant"), in pre-trial detention for a month after he described a fictional attack on the United States Ambassador to Georgia in a post on the forum, which was claimed by the prosecution to have been a threat of an attack on a person enjoying international protection. Human rights organizations criticized the detention as unjustified, arguing that the post was intended as a joke. He was released on bail in May 2016.

== Censorship ==
The forum website was briefly shutdown during the August 2008 Russo-Georgian War. In the following weeks, internet users alleged restrictions on the discussion of political issues on the forum after its administration posted a statement urging the users "to refrain from posts... that would be inappropriate for the state's interests".

The website, owing to its political sub-forum, is blacklisted and banned by the Russian government.
