= Elakiri =

Online community in Sri Lanka

ElaKiri.com
- Website type: Online Community
- Available in: Sinhala, English
- Owner: ElaKiri.com
- Creator: ElaKiri.com
- Website: www.elakiri.com
- Registration: Optional (Required to post on forums)
- Current status: Online

Elakiri Website was built around 2004 and its still the largest online community website from Sri Lanka ElaKiri, also known as ElaKiri.com is a virtual collaborative community which is aimed at creating a platform for members to share knowledge covering a large number of topics. Primarily for the convenience of members, these topics have been categorized under different forums. Members are required to ask questions, answer other users' questions and share their knowledge in the specific forums that have been designated. Under each forum heading, the topics in discussion are sub-categorized into "threads", each consisting of a series of messages followed by a main topic. United Nations Conference on Trade and Development (UNCTAD) Information Economy Report identified ElaKiri.com as one of the most popular sites in Sri Lanka and indication of the ICT growth in the country.

== About ElaKiri ==
ElaKiri's membership base is largely concentrated on Sri Lankan users, including a large number of Sri Lankans living abroad. Site guidelines are influenced mainly by Sri Lankan cultural values, as such any violation of these guidelines may lead to automatic cancellation of one's membership. The site allows any user to open an account upon presenting a valid email address. To encourage active participation, ElaKiri recognizes its members with various levels of seniority depending on the number of posts that each user has made. Users are allowed to use Sinhala or English languages to post in threads. ElaKiri.com was registered on 16 March 2004 and Beta was available in April 2006.

Apart from its stated objective of creating a virtual Sri Lankan community, ElaKiri also makes arrangements for its members to meet in real community gatherings as exhibitions, sports events etc.. Its membership base, as of 3 November 2016 was 549,450 members, with this number growing every day. It is currently one of the most visited web sites in Sri Lanka. It is the largest of Sri Lankan online communities originated in Sri Lanka.

== Elakiri ==
The literal meaning of the word "Elakiri" in Traditional Sinhala is cow's milk. But in colloquial Sinhala it has more dominant meaning as an adjective and sometimes as a noun to describe something very delightful or fantastic. At the time of founding of the site it had become very popular word among the youth, which had helped through the publicity of the site.

== Site design ==
The server-side scripting used in Elakiri is PHP. Elakiri used vBulletin portal since 2004 when it was first launched, but after 18 May 2020, it was migrated to the XenForo forum software. The new platform allows users to select the dark theme if needed. Subsequent to the forum software change, a dedicated online market place was launched on the website.

== Forum and blog ==
The Elakiri forum is one of the major features of Elakiri. Each member may get a title according to the number of posts they add to the forum. There also a reputation system which allow members to rate each other based on their posts. The posting to forums is limited only to the members who have a valid account.
