= VeggieBoards =

Internet forum for vegetarians and vegans

- Website type: Vegetarian and vegan community
- Owner: Huddler
- Creator: Michael
- Website: veggieboards.com
- Commercial: Yes
- Registration: Required only for posting
- Launched: December 2000

VeggieBoards is one of the largest and most active internet forums for vegetarians and vegans. Typical forum topics include issues relating to vegetarianism, veganism, animal welfare, animal rights, the environment, health, physical fitness and recipes. As of June 2012, the forum had over 48,000 registered members and more than 3 million posts. In May 2012, VeggieBoards changed ownership for the first time since its creation. It is now owned by Huddler.

== History ==
VeggieBoards was launched in December 2000. The first big group of members came from the message board at Vegan Outreach that went defunct early in 2001. The next big wave of new members came in April 2003 when the message board at VegWeb closed down and the members were encouraged to sign up with Veggieboards. Initially the forum software was UBB.classic, but it was replaced with vBulletin some time between 2001-2002. All user accounts were lost in the process, so the users had to sign up again.

== Recognition, criticism and the media ==
Reviews and opinions on the site were generally positive, highlighting the "good (though juvenile) conversations" and the large group of regular posters. Posts from VeggieBoards have also been quoted in the mainstream media.

VeggieBoards has been nominated for the VegNews magazine's Veggie Awards several times, most recently in 2009.

== See also ==
- List of Internet forums
