= City-Data =

Information website and forum on US cities

- Website type: Social networking / information site
- Available in: English
- Owners: Advameg, Inc.
- Website: www.city-data.com
- Launched: 2003
- Current status: Active

City-Data is an Illinois-based social networking and information website that presents data and information pertaining to United States cities, and offers public online forums for discussion.

== Data on site ==
US cities, counties, zip codes, and neighborhoods are profiled and compared using governmental data about race, income, education, crime, weather, housing, maps, air pollution, and religions. The site contains information about home value estimates (including recent home sales), local businesses, schools (including their demographics and test scores), hospitals, libraries, tourist attractions, local businesses, restaurant inspection findings, building permits, bridge conditions, hotels, water systems, airports, cell phone towers, property tax assessments, and car accidents.

== Owner ==
City-data.com is owned and operated by Advameg, Inc. of Hinsdale, Illinois.

== Sources ==
The information on the website includes consumer names and street addresses, obtained via FOIA requests and other public records; City-Data has an opt-out feature to break the web-visible association between names and street addresses, but does not remove the consumer names themselves.

== Uses ==
In 2010, because of a post on the People Search forum, a mother and son reunited 17 years after the son was kidnapped.

City-Data has been featured in articles and listicles as a way for potential newcomers to learn more about particular cities.

== See also ==
- List of Internet forums
