= MacTalk Australia =

Former online forum

- Website type: Apple discussion forum
- Owner: Niche Media
- Creators: Matt Kelsh & Anthony Agius
- Website: http://www.mactalk.com.au/
- Registration: Free
- Launched: 1 January 2004
- Current status: Defunct

MacTalk Australia was an online forum dedicated to news, support & discussion amongst Apple enthusiasts or potential users, with an Australian bias.

After its inception in 2004, the forum quickly became a top 10 tech site receiving hundreds of thousands of visits per month. In 2011 the site was sold to Niche Media, owner of Macworld Australia Magazine, and by 2015 a message by the sites' volunteer moderators declared the site dead.

== History ==
=== Origins ===
AppleTalk Australia was founded on 1 January 2004 by Matt "Disko" Kelsh and Anthony "decryption" Agius, after meeting on another tech forum - Overclockers Australia - and banding together to create an online forum for Australian Apple users. The name was borrowed from Apple's own networking product, AppleTalk. The site was initially run through voluntary labour and donations, before turning to a commercial venture, with advertising assisting in the running costs of the site.

=== Name Change ===
In 2006 AppleTalk was rebranded MacTalk Australia. Whilst the site had initially flown under Apple's radar (for using its trademarked name "AppleTalk"), a disgruntled forum member reportedly alerted Apple to the forum's existence, leading to Apple's renowned legal team contacting Agius with a demand to change the forum's name. As the forum was already moving towards becoming a commercial venture, it was rebadged as MacTalk Australia.

=== Controversy ===
In 2008 Agius published claims that Apple had briefed resellers on the Australian iPhone release and later posted pictures of a box that had been sent to a local reseller, labelled "Do Not Open Until 10 June".

=== Awards ===
From July 2004 to June 2005 AppleTalk Australia was ranked #19 in the Hitwise Australia 'News and Media — IT Media' industry based on number of visits, improving to #8 between October and December 2005.

=== Domain and Name ===
The site was originally registered at appletalk.ma.cx but was switched to appletalkaustralia.com on 8 January 2004. In late 2006, to avoid any further trademark issues the site was renamed "MacTalk Australia" on the domain mactalk.com.au

=== MacTalk Members Unite ===
In late August 2008 site founder Anthony "decryption" Agius put out the call to raise $8,500 for a new server. In just four days, MacTalk members raised $5,800. A thank you thread was made shortly after by Anthony, thanking all for their help.

=== Founder's Exit ===
In February 2011, Agius put the site up for sale on auction website Flippa.com for "offers of more than $125,000". In June the same year Agius found a buyer in Niche Media, publishers of Macworld Australia magazine. In an interview, Agius said that "after such a significant financial and personal investment I'm walking away with a significant redundancy package". The transition was temporarily held up when co-founder Matt "Disko" Kelsh, who had left before the site became commercial, threatened legal action over the sale. The sale eventually went ahead for a reported $150,000.

MacTalk's last publisher was Liana Pappas.

== Forum ==
MacTalk's forums run on VBulletin and VBAdvanced.

=== Forum Software ===
The forum originally ran on Invision Power Board 1.3 with a highly customised skin, created by "the_argon". Due to the heavy customisation, an upgrade of the software was fraught with great difficulty and indefinitely put off, but in April 2006 was rebuilt around Invision Power Board version 2.1.4 after the site was hacked. However, due to changes in IPB updates breaking the customised skin, the board was not updated and as a result was hacked once again in October 2006. Rather than rebuild around IPB again, the admins decided to rebuild the skin around vBulletin, this time not using a wrapper, but entirely using the theme engine built in. The adapted skin was built by "iSlayer" over a week-long period while the forums were down. The old database was migrated and the site brought up again. As of October 2010, the front page, generated using Wordpress, was designed by a third party.

=== Media Mentions ===
26 April 2005 - Discussion of the iTunes Music Store in Australia mentioned.

7 March 2007 - A user discovers that the latest version of iTunes mentions TV ratings for Australia, suggesting Apple may be planning to release TV shows through the Australian iTunes Store. The discovery is reported in The Age newspaper.

=== Most popular articles ===
An up-to-date list of the most popular articles can be found on the site.

- Do you need to defrag your Mac HD? The answer revealed! published March 2009, with approx. 209,000 views.
- How to get a US iTunes account - free! published October 2009, with approx. 173,900 views.
- How-To: The ultimate iTunes Media Server published August 2008, with approx. 126,000 views.
- Australian iPhone Release Info Given to Resellers by Apple Australia published May 2008, with approx. 116,000 views.
- How to install Greasemonkey scripts on Safari. published January 2009, with approx. 82,000 views.

== Podcasts ==
On 8 September 2007, Anthony "decryption" Agius released the first MacTalk podcast, "I Only Bought it Because It's New" consisting of himself, Jedda "jedda" Wignall, Peter "fulltimecasual" Wells and Marc "marc" Edwards of Bjango fame. The concept of the podcasts has been a group of guys sitting around drinking beer and talking about current Mac topics. As of June 2013, there are over 255, each approximately an hour long, available for free through the iTunes Store. 13 November 2009 marked the recording of the 100th episode of MacTalk, "Live from the Birmingham Hotel", and on 20 March 2012, the 200th episode was recorded. The podcast's 215th Episode references the second sentence of this Wikipedia entry.

== Hosting ==
MacTalk is currently hosted in Melbourne, Australia, by Intervolve.

== MacTalk Magazine ==
A single issue of MacTalk Magazine was produced, available for free in print and as a PDF.
