= EComFuel =

eComFuel
- Website type: Online community
- Available in: English
- Headquarters: Bozeman, Montana, U.S.
- Owner: Andrew Youderian
- Creator: Andrew Youderian
- Website: ecommercefuel.com
- Commercial: Yes
- Registration: Required (application)
- Launched: 2013; 13 years ago
- Current status: Active

eComFuel is a community for e-commerce business owners based Bozeman, Montana. It runs a forum, hosts a weekly podcast, and publishes annual research reports.

== History ==
eComFuel was founded by Andrew Youderian, a former investment banker, in early 2013 after running his own web stores. By 2016, the membership stood at about 1,000 merchants. The platform began hosting an annual members-only conference, ‘‘eComFuel Live,’’ later that decade.

== Platform and community ==
Admission is subscription-based and requires proof of seven-figure turnover; service providers are not eligible. Inside the forum, merchants discuss fulfilment and operational issues, supported by a vendor directory and regional meet-ups.

== Publications and research ==
Since 2013, the eComFuel Podcast has featured interviews with store owners and industry specialists. Starting in 2015, the platform has published State of the Merchant, later eCommerce Trends, an annual survey of hundreds of seven- and eight-figure merchants; the 2022 edition reported average store revenue of roughly US$7 million and rising customer-acquisition costs as a leading concern.

== See also ==
- List of Internet forums
