= Forum.hr =

Croatian internet forum website

- Website type: Internet forum
- Available in: Croatian
- Owner: Željko Anderlon
- Creator: Željko Anderlon
- Website: www.forum.hr
- Commercial: Yes (ads)
- Registration: free
- Users: 503,144 (27 August 2017)
- Launched: 1999
- Current status: active
- Written in: PHP

Forum.hr is the largest and one of the oldest Croatian general-purpose internet forums. It was launched in 1999 by Željko Anderlon. It originated as a section of the website Monitor.hr, but was eventually singled out with its own domain in 2003. As of August 2017, the forum has nearly 504,000 registered users with nearly 50 million messages. The forum most frequently attracts highly educated individuals, between 18 and 35 of age.

== Influence and legacy ==
A 2009 forum thread Kad si jadna šupendara (When you're a miserable asshole) from the section Usamljena srca (Lonely hearts), where forum users told their love and romance experiences gained over 3 million views with 10,000 messages and was subsequently adapted to theatre play titled "My nuclear love" in 2016. It premiered in Concert Hall Vatroslav Lisinski in Zagreb.

With more than 2 million unique visitors per month in 2010, Forum.hr's impact was large enough to be depicted in the Randall Munroe's xkcd map of online communities.
