= College Confidential (company) =

College admissions counseling company

CollegeConfidential.com (CC) is a college admissions website and online community founded in 2001. It hosts popular college admissions forums on topics such as admissions chances, financial aid, standardized testing, and school life.

== History ==
College Confidential was founded with the stated purpose of "demystifying many aspects of the college admissions process, and to help even 'first timer' students and parents understand the process." The founding editorial team, consisting of Dave Berry, a senior admissions officer; David Hawsey; and Roger Dooley, a parent who is active in high school academics; supplied visitors with college admission content.

== College Confidential Forums ==
The College Confidential Forum is the most heavily used part of the site. It features a 'What Are My Chances?' subforum, where users are evaluated on their chances of acceptance to specific colleges based on their test scores, GPA, and extracurricular activities. There are also various other subforums regarding financial aid, SAT, ACT and AP test preparation, forums for all major colleges and universities, including those in the Ivy League, as well as for many research universities and liberal arts colleges in the United States.

== Media coverage ==
College Confidential was covered in a New York Times front-page story on March 31, 2006. It has also been mentioned in a number of other press stories. The Harvard Crimson described its "chance me" discussions as full of incorrect information and internet trolls.

== See also ==
- List of Internet forums
