= Dek-D.com =

Thai-language youth-oriented website

Home page of Dek-D.com in 2020

Dek-D.com is a Thai-language youth-oriented website, featuring a large online community and education-related content. It was launched on 31 December 1999 by four students from Suankularb Wittayalai School, and since 2005 has been operated by Bangkok-based Dek-D Interactive Co., Ltd. It is one of the most visited Thailand-based websites and has been ranked among the top five by web traffic analyzer Truehits since 2008.

Dek-D.com's main features include community discussion forums; education-related original and curated content, especially related to university admissions; and a writer's section which serves as a web fiction publishing platform. Many web novels first published on the website have been taken up by publishers and adapted into television series. The site has about three million monthly visitors, as of 2018.

== History ==
Dek-D.com is a Thai teenager website that was founded in 2005 by four fifth-grade students from Suankularb Wittayalai School. When the creators of Dek-D.com were young, they usually used a computer in their daily life. Then one day, they came up with the idea of making their website and hoped for it to become a community for students from different schools. So, when they studied secondary 4, they tried to design the interface of the website, and the graphic or theme to use with their website by finding information and learning about how to make a website from the beginning from the internet and some search engine like Yahoo. Before making Dek-D.com, many teenagers, especially secondary 4 to 6 students talked about attending university, and they also talked about entertainment stuff, love, and foretelling. Thus, the creator decided to make a website about how to attend the university, a university's news, and create a community to share the knowledge with other people who attend this website to find the university's news, because there are a lot of Thai community websites. Still, none of them focus on student and university stuff. In the beginning, this website's name was not Dek-D, for examples, Generation X, Millennium, Thaichildren, Thaiteen, and Teenager, but in the end, they chose the name "Dek-D" to represent that this website is a Thai website, and it is for Thai students or teenagers. In the earliest stage, Dek-D.com lets people post their questions and wait for other people to answer on the website according to the objective of this website is to be a community for teenagers from different schools in Thailand to talk and share their stories, experience, and also educational content. Now, this website has been registered and operates under the name of Dek-D Interactive Co., Ltd.

== Interface ==
Dek-D.com website operates with Thai language which is the one and only language on this website. Orange and white have been chosen to be the main theme color of Dek-D.com, this theme has been used and displayed on every page of the website such as the main page up to the page of each topic. On the top of the main page there is the topic bar with the several topics included, those topics represent all the main contents of this website. For some topics that are included with sub-topics, those sub-topics will show when the mouse cursor is pointing at that topic on the topic bar. Under the topic bar, there are several sections of content displayed on this website. The topmost section is the top trending contents of the website. After that, there are the recommended articles from Dek-D.com. The next section is the updated content section which includes a thread about TCAS, teen stories and user's thread. In the section of each thread, there is a trending thread and recent thread of each topic. Apart from those sections, there are some news and articles about a general topic, and also the details of some activities and fairs. There are some topic tags on the right side of the main page, those tags can be used to link the user to some contents that are not shown on the main page. On the page of each thread posted, other users can interact with that thread by writing their comments.

== Content ==
From the website interface, there are several topics and contents on Dek-D.com, and those contents can be reached by clicking the topic of the content that the user is interested in on the topic bar. This section describes the contents in each topic as shown below.

=== User's thread ===
This topic contains threads that the users have posted on Dek-D.com. The topic of those threads can be about anything up to the user for example, news, articles, sharing personal experience, asking questions, etc. The distinctive point of the user's thread topic is that all users can freely post their thread about any topic to share, ask, or talk about anything they want, and other users can do the same thing and interact with those threads by writing their comments.

=== Novel ===
This topic contains a lot of novels that you can read with no charges. Those novels have been classified into several categories according to the content of each novel, so the users can easily find and read their interested novels by searching that novel from its category. On the top of this page, there are two sections which are recommended novels and novel reviews. All users can register to this website and be a member of this website to write and publish their novel on this website for free. All novels on this website are written in Thai as this is a Thai website.

=== Quiz ===
There are a lot of quizzes with different categories that users can do on this page of website, for example, the quiz about fortune telling, love, entertainment, movie, game, pet, general knowledge, education, etc. Those quizzes have been classified by their categories. Users can create their own quiz and publish to the public, so that other users can also do your quiz.

=== TCAS ===
TCAS page contains articles and news about admission to a university in Thailand. This topic helps students in many schools in Thailand by sharing important information about university admission. This page has the special feature that is called "TCAS Alert" that displays the notification-like window about the most recent TCAS articles and news that students should know as soon as possible.

=== Activity and camp ===
This page contains the articles about the activities and camps for students. The content of this page mostly focuses on the educational activities and camps for example, an open house fair, job training, or the camp that is organized by university, but there are also non-educational activities too such as reforestation activity, or TikTok challenge. There is the special feature for this page which is the calendar that shows the schedule of the events that will happen soon.

=== Study thread ===
There are three sections included in this page which are school report, open book, and easy science. For the school report, it is about schools' news, the competition for students, etc. For open book, this section contains articles that mostly suggest the interesting stuff about study life that can benefit students. About easy science, this section contains basic scientific articles that happen in our daily life, so the users can easily understand and enjoy these facts

=== Study abroad ===
On this page, there are news, articles, and also threads about studying abroad. It contains a lot of information that can help or guide students who are interested in studying abroad. It also contains articles about exchange students and the scholarship for students.

=== NUGIRL ===
NUGIRL is the page that mostly contains articles for girls. There are several sections of content categorized by the topics of the contents which are fashion, NUGIRL guru, beauty, health, relationship, lifestyle, and NUGIRL special.

=== Teen life ===
This page contains articles and threads about teen life especially love, sex, and life problems. There are few sections of content categorized by topics which are sex education, love & learn, do & don't, and inter's sex. For the first two sections, it contains six recent articles and ten recent threads according to their topic. And for the last two sections, it contains only six recent articles.

=== Pre-test ===
This page is used to register for the TCAS Dek-D's pre-admission test. This test has been organized by Dek-D for students who want to prepare themselves before doing the real admission exams. Students can find out more information about this pre-admission test from reviews and articles on this website page.

=== Dek-D event ===
This topic does not have its own page but there are two sub-topic pages which are TCAS fair and Art & Fandom fair. These two sub-pages contain information about those two fairs which were organized by Dek-D.

=== Online tutoring ===
This page is for selling courses about TCAS. There are some articles, reviews, and also Q & A about these courses.

=== App ===
This page can link users to the platform for downloading the apps which were launched by Dek-D. It lists some important features of each app and shows some images of each app. Those three apps are Dek-D TCAS, Dek-D novel, and Dek-D writer.

=== Product ===
This page is the store page for selling Dek-D's products such as a book about TCAS and the experiences of each job, and stationaries.

== Impact ==
There is a community for those who want to write and share novels on Dek-d.com. Because it costs a lot of money to print a novel book, in the past, a person who wanted to sell it would do it with assurance. Dek-novel's page on the internet is free to use, allowing novelists to test their writing talents without spending any money, and website visitors to read the novel without paying anything. Dek-D.com believes that Thai people are just as skilled as individuals in other international countries. The novelist and readers like Dek-d.com because they have a perspective that has allowed it to develop and consistently rank as the top website for teenagers for ten years. The largest community in Thailand nowadays is made up of authors and readers. At the end of 2018, there were a record number of 960,000 books, 150,000 authors, and 60,000,000 followers.

People who are interested in or who wish to create a website might get inspiration at Dek-d.com. Dek-d.com didn't start making money from their website until after their first year of operation when some people contacted them about advertising and it became an experience teaching people that if you want to do business, try to find an example before someone and others will dare to follow. Currently, there are many websites in Thailand, some of which were inspired by Dek-d.com and others which were created as a result of the inspiration for other businesses to launch their own websites.

Many individuals visit Dek-d.com in order to read or find out about admissions information and university news. It used to be quite difficult for students to enroll in a university because some don't disclose their admissions requirements on their websites or other online platforms; rather, if they wanted to know, they would have to visit the institution in person. Exam days at some universities coincide with those at other universities. Dek-d.com gathers the university's selection criteria and disseminates them to people who wish to enroll there via the Dek-d website. Most people who wish to go to college lack knowledge about how to attend university and prepare themselves in a way that will improve their chances of admission. Some teenagers are interested in international universities and the news that they publish. The many faculties of universities in Thailand host camps and other events. To find their favorite instructor, people might participate in a variety of events. Dek-d.com disseminates information about faculty and helps individuals become familiar with faculties besides those of engineering and medical. Dek-d.com offers a course for learning using videos that users may access from any location and other businesses that deal with studying, for instance, talk shows about how to prepare for college. Before the official test, Dek-D.com has prepared a test for themselves that receives a score for admission to the university.
