= Server.com =

Saas company (1996 - 2007)

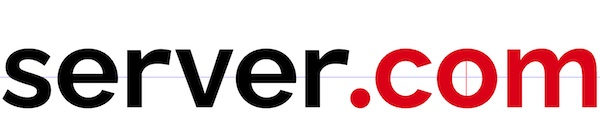
- Website type: SaaS
- Dissolved: 2007
- Successor: YourWebApps.com
- Headquarters: Boston, MA, USA
- Founder: Sean Brunnock
- Website: server.com at the Wayback Machine (archived 1999-04-27)
- Launched: September 1996
- Current status: Defunct
- Written in: Perl

Server.com was a pioneering software as a service (SaaS) website. They provided a suite of services from 1996 until 2007. It was the first SaaS site to offer a variety of services and the first to use the term WebApp to describe its services. It was selected as an Incredibly Useful Site by Yahoo! Internet Life magazine. net magazine listed Server.com among the 100 most influential websites of all time.

Server.com launched in 1996 offering the first online personal information manager.

In 1997, they rolled out the first threaded message board service; the first web based mailing list manager; one of the first online calendar services; and one of the first online form builders.

In 2000, Server.com partnered with NBCi and became server.snap.com until 2001.

In 2001, Server.com was serving 100 million monthly pageviews. Media Life declared it one of the 20 biggest ad domains on the Web.

In 2002, Server.com developed one of the first web-based RSS aggregators.

In 2007, all services were moved to YourWebApps.com.

The domain name Server.com was sold in 2009 for $770,000.
