= Beyond.ca =

Beyond.ca is a Canadian automotive enthusiasts internet forum based in Calgary, Alberta, Canada. Beyond.ca was founded in 2002 by Shelton Kwan and Kenny Chan.

== In the news ==
In 2007 Beyond.ca was at the center of a front page news story. A forum member posted for help seeking eyewitnesses to a hit and run accident involving an Acura RSX. Unaware of the earlier forum discussion, another forum member, Dave Watling a.k.a. Calgary Dave, posted that he had witnessed a hit and run accident and had the high resolution photos to prove it. Police credited the photographic evidence when laying charges against the teenaged suspect. The story hit the front page of Digg and received nearly 3,000 diggs.

In March 2008 The New York Times ran a story that played out on Beyond.ca that again showed how powerful a large community of automotive enthusiasts can be when they work together. A forum member had posted that his Nissan Skyline was stolen and posted pictures and description of the vehicle. Within a day, forum members spotted the vehicle and located the residence of the car thief. This story was also featured on Wired and AutoBlog.

== Forums expansion ==
In early 2006, Beyond.ca began a transformation from a car forum into a car community. The number of forums not related to automobiles increased steadily, and were added based on suggestions submitted by forum members. While some members did not support this diversification, the wider scope of the forums caused forum membership to grow rapidly to the point that automobile discussion is now no longer the major focus of the forums.
