= Head for Points =

British travel website

- Available in: English
- Owner: Robert Burgess
- Website: www.headforpoints.com

Head for Points is a British travel website covering discussion of airline frequent-flyer programs and hotel loyalty programs in the UK. It has been referenced by National Geographic, CNN, and the BBC. The site has a predominantly UK-based readership, and served up 3.2 million page views to 732,000 unique users in October 2024.

The website typically publishes three new articles per day, with about half of the posts focussed on British Airways and Avios points.

== See also ==
- FlyerTalk
