= HotCopper =

Australian financial online chat forum

Report Card Pty Ltd t/as Hotcopper
- Type: Internet forum
- Industry: Financial services
- Founded: 1994
- Headquarters: Australia
- Parent: Gumtree Australia Markets Limited
- Website: hotcopper.com.au

HotCopper is an Australian stock market online chat forum that allows its users to discuss financial topics. As of 2015, HotCopper was in the top 170 websites in Australia and was the 5th most popular financial services site in Australia, according to Alexa rankings. In June 2022, the site ranked third in it category, as the 193rd most popular site in Australia, with six million annual visits.

It is the oldest and the largest independent, fee-free trading forum for ASX stock market investors, having started as a bulletin board in 1994 and then moving to the web in 1995. Operated by Report Card Pty Ltd, a subsidiary of Gumtree Australia Markets Limited.

HotCopper obtained an Australian Financial Services Licence (AFSL) in March 2010.

HotCopper is often quoted by other information services, in books and in numerous market related economic and social studies, such as in trading books like Investors Web Guide.

== History ==
HotCopper started by Ron Gully as a bulletin board in 1994 and then went to the web in 1995. The first recorded listing in The Web Archive is 1998.

HotCopper is named after "hot" 1c and 2c shares which derive their name from the 1c and 2c coins in Australia which were made of copper (no longer in circulation) i.e. "Hot" "Copper". The original HotCopper Logo was an image of a 1c and 2c coin.

The website first came to prominence in 1997 when an oil discovery in Manila was reported in a post on HotCopper generating 45,000 hits. The post on HotCopper caused the stock to run. The company reported to the ASX, after a price query, that the price movement was due to the HotCopper post.

By December 1999, all posts were vetted by a moderator who was a trained investment adviser to ensure the site did not give investment advice. HotCopper was listed on the Australian Securities Exchange in December 1999 by Tony Cunningham of stockbroker D J Carmichael, who bought stake in the company from founder Ron Gully. In January 2000, HotCopper became a division of Bourse Data after it was acquired by the company for $11 million. The acquisition made HotCopper a division of Bourse Data. In 2001, Bourse Data merged with St.George Bank, which reprivatized and sold HotCopper to private interests. The Financial Arena then sold HotCopper to Perth-based company Report Card Pty Ltd through a deal brokered by Cunningham in 2004.

By September 2012, the company had 170,000 members and received 6,000 posts a day. HotCopper reported having 170,000 active users by 2016. At that time, the managing director was Greg D'Arcy and Steven James, Tony Cunningham of CPS Capital, and Alec Pismiris of Capital Investment Partners serving as directors.

In 2016, the company was listed on the ASX as HotCopper Holdings, which acquired all shares in its owner, then Report Card Pty Ltd.

In June 2020, HotCopper's parent company changed its name to The Market Herald. In November 2023, the company announced it would rebrand to The Market Limited.
