= Professional Pilots Rumour Network =

Passing of Ex F/E Dave Gritton 8 March 2023

PPRuNe
- Website type: Online community
- Founded: 1996
- Headquarters: El Segundo, California
- Owner: MH Sub I, LLC d/b/a Internet Brands
- Website: www.pprune.org

The Professional Pilots Rumour Network, or PPRuNe, is an Internet forum catering to airline pilots and others in the aviation industry. The site was originally presented by Danny Fyne (later assisted by Robin Lloyd) as an email list in 1993. It progressed to a bulletin board and then to web-based Internet forum, and acts as a "rumour exchange" for airline pilots.

PPRuNe is known in European and Anglophone pilot circles and is cited by media in reports relating to aviation. Since the site has more than 250,000 registered members, many of them pilots, the site is sometimes at the center of debates about aviation issues in the news. Commercial pilots often share insights and perspectives about aviation mishaps, sometimes eyewitness accounts.

The site was acquired in August 2008 by Internet Brands.

== See also ==
- List of Internet forums
