= Dudebro II =

- Developer: Grimoire Assembly Forge
- Publisher: Grimoire Assembly Forge
- Engine: XNA Game Studio
- Platform: Microsoft Windows
- Release: NA: TBA
- Genre: Shooter
- Modes: Single-player, multiplayer

Dudebro — My Shit Is Fucked Up So I Got to Shoot/Slice You II: It's Straight-Up Dawg Time, commonly shortened as Dudebro II, was an unreleased 2D sidescrolling shooting/slicing action game that is under development by members of the NeoGAF community. Release of the game has been pushed back from the originally intended 2010 to 2011, but after development was rebooted no further release dates were ever announced by the developers.

After years of troubled development, the developers announced in 2017 the game would no longer have any references to NeoGAF, directly in response to a MeToo controversy surrounding the website, and that all the work put into the project would be reused under a new developer name. However, no further updates about those plans were ever issued. Some of the level design was salvaged and released in 2015 as 2 user-made levels in Super Mario Maker, making these the only playable content ever released from this project.

It was intended to parody modern military shooter video games, and contrary to its name, is not a sequel to any previously released game title. The developers, however, had come up with a fictional series of prequels.

== Plot ==
The game would have followed the story of B.R.O. Alliance Forces members John Dudebro and his sidekick, Habemus Chicken.

At the start of the game a briefing with the B.R.O. Alliance General Dawgless Lee takes place, where the protagonists are shown a polaroid picture of the eye-scarred and mustachioed Armando Pesquali. Pesquali is a terrorist known to have been selling illegal weapons in the Middle East. Dudebro and Chicken are then tasked to find the man and stop his arms trade.

== Gameplay ==
John Dudebro standing below the game title in a forest area from the Alaska chapter

The game was a 2D side-scrolling shooter that utilized 8 bit styled retro pixel art, and modern features such as complex physics and video post processing techniques.

John Dudebro, controlled by the player, would have traversed hostile environments filled with enemies to proceed through the game. Movement and actions are all controlled with the keyboard or a game controller. These actions include shooting, slicing, changing weapons, picking up objects, throwing objects, and more. Dudebro's health bar, named Brodiocity Meter, refills when the player performs certain tasks, such as killing enemies, rescuing ladies or drinking beer. When the player is using a game controller, Dudebro can switch weapons in real time with a weapon wheel.

The game would have featured a number of different environments, set in different locations around the world, with complex layouts reminiscent of other games in the Metroidvania genre. By exploring each environment, Dudebro can acquire additional weapons and gear, and collect medals which are used to access boss fights and unlock subsequent chapters. Some boss fights are concluded with a button mashing quick time event named Fist Bump Finisher.

The humorous tone of the game would have permeated multiple aspects of the gameplay, as several elements are explicitly designed to spoof and subvert common tropes from the modern action and shooter video game genres. The gameplay debut trailer, for instance, mocks forced hacking minigames and the ability to only carry a maximum of two weapons at the same time, both common in modern first person shooters: in the game, the first can be skipped by pressing a button, and the latter gets laughed at by the main characters during a cutscene.

== Development ==
Dudebro began with an offhand comment made by a user named Cuyahoga on the NeoGAF forum. Cuyahoga made up the title to mock another user who accused him of being a pedophile because he purchased and enjoyed the game Imagine: Babyz Fashion. The title was a source of inspiration, and the NeoGAF users Jocchan, Thetrin and Mik2121 took the initiative in the actual conception of the game. They were then followed by a large number of posters who began discussions, collaborating on the ideas and assets for a real game. Eventually, Will Goldstone (who wrote a book on Unity) became involved with programming. The newborn project caught immediately the attention of the gaming press.

The NeoGAF users were able to get Jon St. John to voice the titular character, John Dudebro. St. John is notable for being the voice actor for the character Duke Nukem in the Duke Nukem game franchise.

The game, originally scheduled for release in summer 2010, was later pushed to 2011. Currently, Dudebro's application source code is open to all NeoGAF members who are willing to contribute to the game's improvement. At one point, the name the group of developers use ("Grimoire Assembly Forge") drew threats of a lawsuit because of an alleged trademark infringement of "Grimoire", a role-playing game developed and published by Grimoire Systems Pty. Ltd.

=== Cancelled top-down version ===
The game was originally set to be released as a 3D top-down shooter presented in a 3rd person perspective, with 2D sprite-based characters in 3D environments, developed with the Unity engine. The player was meant to controls Dudebro's movement with the keyboard and aim with the mouse. Weapons and upgrades would have been available through the player environment.

The gameplay was mission-based, with each map offering a certain number of missions that needed be completed in order to unlock the level's boss door. Missions were accessed by touching medal-shaped markers scattered across the map and accepted in a subsequent prompt, and they could involve changes in level design, weapon sets and enemy spawns. Mission objectives could involve killing enemies, doing speedruns, saving girls, finding hidden objects or surviving for a set amount of time. Completing each mission would award the user a medal, and some of them unlock new paths in the level to give the player access to more missions or allow easier backtracking. Completed missions and levels could be replayed anytime, and unlocked paths would stay unlocked in subsequent playthroughs.

The game later switched to a 2D side-scrolling version after multiple dropouts left the team too understaffed to continue development.

== See also ==
- Broforce, another satire of modern military shooters unrelated to this project's development team, released in 2015
