= Milnet.ca =

- Website type: Online forum and information wiki regarding the Canadian Forces
- Owner: Private
- Creator: Mike Bobbitt
- Website: http://milnet.ca
- Commercial: Optional
- Registration: Optional

Milnet.ca is a website privately owned by Canadian officer Lieutenant Colonel Mike Bobbitt, which serves mainly as an online discussion group regarding the Canadian Forces.

The site has been in operation since 1993, but up until 2007 it went by the name Army.ca and CdnArmy.ca. The site offers two levels of membership for registered users. Free registration is mandatory to participate in forum discussions, while paid subscription provides access to a private forum as well as entitlement to a complimentary numbered Army.ca challenge coin and a t-shirt.

== Overview ==
The site consists of discussion forums, real time chat, information pages and a wiki for various topics relevant to the current Canadian military, as well as sections on current foreign militaries and historical information on the Canadian Army. The site has received passing mention in news articles in various media including radio, television, and print. and it is believed senior leadership of the Canadian Forces may monitor the site.

The site's proclaimed goal is to be a source of information regarding the Canadian Forces, and members of the Canadian Forces have declared themselves to be among the membership.

Monitoring of army.ca by print and television journalists has become evident through their use of quotes from postings on the site, such as The Hill Times, an independently-owned weekly newspaper covering Canadian federal politics and government. Army.ca also publishes its own editorial content, and has received guest editorials by former Canadian Liberal Member of Parliament Carolyn Parrish, and historian Dr Jack Granatstein.

Army.ca has been listed by Library and Archives Canada as a general research website and has been listed on the web site of the Canadian Museum of Civilization and Canadian War Museum among their listed reference sites for "Military and naval history - Canada." Army.ca has also been listed among other military websites by the online learning centre geometry.net

== History ==
The site originated in 1993 as The Canadian Army Home Page (Unofficial). For many years, the site was run as CdnArmy.ca, until the Army.ca domain was obtained. The most recent evolution of the site occurred in 2007 when it transformed into Milnet.ca, which actually consists of four similarly styled sites differentiated by colour schemes reflective of Canada's three environmental commands. The Milnet.ca family of sites consists of:

- Milnet.ca
- Army.ca
- Navy.ca
- Air-Force.ca

== Registered users ==
In May 2010 the site listed 25,900+ registered users, not counting deleted inactive accounts. Registration offers two abilities; to post messages to the forum, and to send private messages to other registered users. All site content available to regular registered users is also available to non-registered users. Approximately 11,600 of the over 25,900+ registered users have posted messages to the forum; and over 3,800 users have posted more than 10 times.

== Official notice ==
For a brief period, an official web forum established by the Canadian Army experienced difficulties maintaining a stable forum capability and on at least one occasion referred viewers to the army.ca forum as an alternative.

The level of activity by Canadian Forces members at Army.ca has been given passing mention in at least one professional publication, the Canadian Army Journal. In his article "The Blogs of War", Major Andrew Godefroy, CD, PhD, speculated that "if only half of those registered at Army.ca were currently serving soldiers, it could suggest that as much as 13% of the total Army (regular force and reserve) might be members of just this one website." This was published at a time when Army.ca had 7993 registered members (though only about 50% of registered users have actively participated in the forums). The number of actual military users of the site has never been formally established, and due to the anonymous nature of participation there, such a determination is not likely to be made. It is known that large numbers of persons identifying themselves as civilians frequent the site.

The Army.ca forum was described as a "top-notch weblog" (sic) among "excellent discussion forums in Canada" by retired Commodore Eric Lehre while speaking to the House of Commons of Canada Standing Committee on National Defence and Veterans Affairs (SCONDVA) on October 20, 2005.

== Resources ==
Army.ca is an online source of current information on the Canadian Forces. Due to the participation of serving and retired military service personnel, inquiries to the site can receive advice based on personal experience and first-hand knowledge. The site's mission statement reads in part: "... Army.ca attempts to provide accurate and timely information of interest to serving and potential members of the CF, however any information obtained from this page comes "as is" and it's [sic] accuracy cannot be guaranteed."

Although the site is under civilian ownership, participants are strongly encouraged to include their actual military experience and qualifications in their profiles. Posters are free to use pseudonyms, however, and there is a general agreement not to use rank to weight the merits of contributions. Arguably, this mixture of anonymity and accountability fosters the best conditions for a discourse free of the constraints of rank structure but allowing for military experience to be considered in considering the merit of individual contributions.

In particular, army.ca features resources for discussion of the recruiting process, trades in the Canadian Military (with specific separate boards for infantry, artillery, armour, engineers, communication and electronics, military police and support trades among others. Forum boards for posts on Navy and Air Force topics of interest, including sub-boards for individual services and Special Operations Command, are also maintained. There are also separate boards for current military news as well as domestic and international political discussions. A forum called "Radio Chatter" allows for free off-topic discussions.

A large variety of FAQs threads have been created for the convenience of new members, and the advanced search function enables effective searches for recent information of subjects within only those boards of the forum that may contain the most relevant responses.

Army.ca is also unique among Canadian military forums in being one of only a few to have a French language forum, in this case consisting of eight separate boards.

== Relations with mainstream media ==
Army.ca has on one occasion drawn negative attention to itself from a journalist of the mainstream (print) media. In March 2002, a poster claiming to be journalist David Pugliese felt obligated to register at the site in order to defend himself against what he saw as undue criticism and personal attacks by army.ca posters dubious about his writings on the highly secret Joint Task Force 2.

At times, army.ca has also expressed official criticism of the media in general through the release of editorials as well as public comments by site administrators. For example, in July 2006 print articles reacting to the death of Corporal Tony Boneca in Afghanistan drew the ire of the site. An editorial by the site's Ruxted Group stated:

We are of the view that speculation at this point in time by those members of the media, politicians and others who are critical of the mission in Afghanistan, is grossly inappropriate and a complete indignity to the respect that is due by us all to a soldier who has paid the highest price."

A forum moderator, responding to the site's own editorial, further stated:

The media’s current feeding-frenzy of speculation is akin to that of jackals over carrion, and it is despicable. I would ask that the media cease this unbecoming behaviour, and allow Cpl Boneca's family, friends, and fellow service members to grieve over the loss of their loved one in peace, and to stop using the loss of a fine soldier to fuel what appears to be an attempt to further a political agenda."

Between May 17 and June 30, 2007, when an anti-war group in Quebec was distributing letters to soldiers at CFB Valcartier about to deploy to Afghanistan, encouraging them to desert, a lengthy discussion of the contents of the letter and the group's tactics ensued on Army.ca. The discussion also included postings from people claiming to be the organization distributing the letters. The National Post included some of the commentary in a story on June 12:

News of the letter drew a furious response on an Internet forum at army.ca. Under the heading, "Peaceniks Try Direct Mail on Vandoos Destined for AFG," one member suggested another use for the mailing. "I certainly hope the letters were written on a soft but absorbent paper, so they can be used by the soldiers for a function appropriate to the contents," a contributor named Colin P. wrote."

== Security risks ==
In September 2006, the Chief of the Defence Staff (Canada's highest ranking soldier) singled out web logs and internet forums as a significant potential security risk, fearing that "troops may be revealing sensitive details of military operations through their internet activities, potentially jeopardizing missions as well as the lives of personnel or their families." The CDS directed soldiers to clear any internet postings "however innocuous" with their chain of command. Posters at army.ca publicly inferred that the comments referred directly to their website, though the CDS did not name any specific blogs or sites.

== The Ruxted Group ==
By 2006, a feeling that military matters were being poorly presented in the mainstream media led to the creation of the Ruxted Group – a semi-anonymous consortium that began to publish editorials at army.ca through which Ruxted invites responding commentary from the army.ca readership. Army.ca disclaims the Ruxted Group articles such that the ".. materials are provided "as is" and Army.ca assumes no responsibility for any typographical or other inaccuracies in the document.... Reasonable efforts are taken by The Ruxted Group to ensure that the factual representations in the materials are accurate at the time the materials are submitted to Army.ca for publication. " The Ruxted editorials to date have not drawn negative reaction from the mainstream media though some blogs, discussion sites and minor media outlets have made mention of the group’s work.

In 2006 The Ruxted Group and Army.ca separated, although the two are still closely aligned a functional and practical division has allowed each organization to focus on its own area of expertise. The Ruxted Group maintains its focus on correcting public knowledge and perception about the Canadian military through the blog's editorial style.

The Ruxted Group ceased publication on its website in January 2009 after attracting few public comments to its editorials.
