= Krstarica =

Serbian web portal

Krstarica d.o.o.
- Type: Limited company
- Industry: Internet, computer software
- Genre: Media, services, and software.
- Founded: March 26, 1999
- Founder: Ivan Petrović
- Headquarters: Belgrade, Serbia
- Area served: Serbia.
- Website: www.krstarica.com

Krstarica (English: Cruiser) is a Serbian web portal and software service provider, founded by Ivan Petrović in 1999. Krstarica's services include a search engine, a forum, an online chat service, news, and a Serbian website index. Krstarica averages around 1.6 million monthly visitors.
