= 6park =

Chinese internet forum

- Website type: Internet forum
- Available in: Chinese
- Website: www.6park.com
- Commercial: Yes
- Launched: July 17, 2003
- Current status: Under maintenance

6park (Chinese: 留园网; pinyin: liú yúan) is a Chinese Internet forum specializing in news written in Mandarin Chinese, launched in 2003. Its Chinese name means "a place which people are reluctant to leave". It is a "mega-BBS" with forums for subjects as diverse as economics, health, marriage, and online movies, etc. 6park's style is unique and unrelated to other mega-BBSes such as 2channel.

6park has a large community of overseas Chinese students and ex Chinese citizens from around the world, especially people from North America.

It has been mentioned in news sources such as Hua Sheng Online as a way for Chinese people living overseas to get news. The website provides news from China, as well as translating news from foreign media (such as newspaper, television and websites).
