= ClutchFans =

Fan site

- Website type: Houston Rockets Fan Site
- Owner: David "Clutch" Hardisty
- Creator: David "Clutch" Hardisty
- Website: Official website
- Registration: Free
- Launched: August 8, 1996

ClutchFans is a Houston Rockets fan site, founded by David "Clutch" Hardisty.

Originally named Clutch City, the site was developed as a place for Rockets fans to gather and talk about the team, on August 8, 1996. The site provides a plethora of information and discussion about the Rockets' past, present, and future.

In response to the fan site's outreach, ClutchFans has received access to Houston Rockets players and personnel as a member of the press.

== History ==
ClutchFans was started in 1996 out of a moment of fun. The creator of the site hacked into an internet account and learned how to put web pages together and posted on the Internet. The first pages were concocted under the pseudonym of Clutch and the pages created were about Clutch's favorite subject: the Houston Rockets. Clutch posted game recaps and commentary as well as news stories from around the country on the Rockets. It has a dedicated radio show on a local sports station. The site began with the name "Clutch City 97" but has since gone through several name changes due to copyrights and personal opinion. As well as changing in name, the site has also changed in appearance, number of visitors, and registered membership.

== Achievements ==
- 2000 - Recognized as the impetus of the "Save the Rockets" movement in ESPN The Magazine, May Issue, The Pulse, pg 38.
- 2000 - Cited in ESPN The Magazine as part of The Pulse, November Issue, pg 44.
- 2001 - Recognized by Sports Illustrated in the March 5, 2001 issue as "one of the more imaginative and thorough fan-operated sites on the Web".
- 2006 - Nicknamed "The Undisputed Grandaddy of NBA Fansites" by Sports Illustrated (SI.com).
- 2008 - Cited as "one of the longest running independent hoops websites around, old school and rock solid like the Sugarhill Gang" by the Los Angeles Times.

== See also ==
- List of Internet forums
