= Eng-Tips Forums =

English-language knowledge market website

- Website type: Collaboration
- Available in: English
- Owner: Engineering.com
- Website: eng-tips.com/
- Commercial: Yes
- Registration: Optional
- Launched: November 4, 1997
- Current status: Active

Eng-Tips Forums is an English-language knowledge market website that allows users to post engineering-related questions to be answered and answer questions asked by other users. The targeted audience of Eng-Tips is engineering professionals.

The website's content is primarily composed of engineering forums. All of the content is generated by the users of the website. The forums' subjects include several areas of engineering, including aerospace, structural, and mechanical. Users of the website have the option of marking a post as helpful, flagging it as inappropriate, or doing nothing with the post. Marking a post as helpful gives stars to the person creating the post. The website is designed for professional engineers and discourages students from posting homework questions.

Members of the website have the option of remaining anonymous. Users who wish to receive e-mail notifications of new posts are given the option of adding their e-mail address to the website.

Eng-Tips was started in 1997 by the Tecumseh Group. In 2015 Eng-Tips was acquired by Engineering.com, Inc. It earns money by selling advertising on the website and by e-mailing targeted advertisements to its members. Eng-Tips has about 1,000,000 members.
