= Pruning (disambiguation) =

Pruning is the practice of removing unwanted portions from a plant.

Pruning may also refer to:

== Computer science ==
- Decision tree pruning, a method of simplification of a decision tree
- Pruning (artificial neural network), a method of simplification of an artificial neuronal network
- Pruning (morphology), a technique used in digital image processing based on mathematical morphology

== Biology and medicine ==
- Pruning (viticulture), how pruning is used in vine training systems
- Synaptic pruning, the reformation of neural structure by pruning "excess" neurons or neural clusters
