= Suomi24 =

Finnish internet forum and news website

Suomi24 is a Finnish internet forum and entertainment news website. As of 2020, it was the largest internet forum in Finland.

== History ==
The history of Suomi24 dates back to 1998, when the website was known as Sirkus.com. In 2000, Scandinavia Online Ab became the owner and the site was renamed Suomi24. In 2001, Eniro bought Scandinavia Online as part of the Eniro-group. Since 2008, Suomi24 Oy has been independent company owned by Aller Media Oy, part of Danish company Aller Media, and Eniro. Aller sold Suomi24 to City Digital Group in 2019.

A corpus collected from the forums was made available for research in the Finnish Language Bank (Kielipankki) in 2015. The corpus consists of messages reaching back to 2001.
