= NikeTalk =

Online footwear forum

Logo of Niketalk.com

NikeTalk is an Internet forum for the discussion of sneakers and sneaker collecting. This website was started by Nelson Cabral, from Montreal in Canada on December 10, 1999. Since then Niketalk has evolved past just talking about shoes, and now is a place for discussion about sports, the media, music, video games, and the news.

On July 18, 2012, NikeTalk moved from the Yuku platform to Huddler; users can find Niketalk through Niketalk.com.

On May 22, 2014, NikeTalk's operator Huddler, Inc was acquired by Wikia, which led to NikeTalk partnering with Wikia.

In February 2016, NikeTalk, in collaboration with Wikia, created a series of confessional videos containing interviews from NikeTalk community members at the Wikia headquarters.

In July 2017, NikeTalk enlisted the services of Communityhired.com who oversaw Niketalk's migration to a new platform, independent hosting, and the development of their new and improved website.

== Media recognition ==
NikeTalk has been mentioned in COMPLEX, Newsweek, Time magazine, the LA Times, Adbusters, the Associated Press, the Wall Street Journal, Details magazine, and the Philippine Daily Inquirer.
