= Structurae =

Online architecture database

Structurae logo

Structurae is an online database containing pictures and information about structural and civil engineering works, and their associated engineers, architects, and builders.

== Overview ==
Structurae was founded in 1998 by Nicolas Janberg, who had studied civil engineering at Princeton University. In March 2012, Structurae was acquired by Ernst & Sohn, a subsidiary of John Wiley & Sons, Inc., with Janberg joining the company as Structurae's editor-in-chief. At that time, the website received more than one million pageviews per month, and was available in English, French and German. In 2015, Janberg bought the site back to operate it as a freelancer again.
