= XenForo =

Internet forum software

- Developers: XenForo Limited, Kier Darby, Mike Sullivan, Chris Deeming
- Release: March 8, 2011
- Written in: PHP
- Platform: PHP, MySQL
- Available in: English
- Type: Forum software
- License: Commercial proprietary software
- Website: xenforo.com

XenForo is an Internet forum software package written in the PHP programming language. The software is developed by former vBulletin lead developers Kier Darby and Mike Sullivan. The first public beta release of XenForo was released in October 2010, the stable version on March 8, 2011. The program includes several search engine optimization (SEO) features.

On November 12, 2014, Chris Deeming joined the development team. One of his products, Xen Media Gallery, now XenForo Media Gallery, joined the XenForo family of products.

== Development ==
One of the developers of XenForo, Kier Darby, had been a lead developer for the community platform vBulletin. The original owner of vBulletin, Jelsoft, was acquired by the American new media company Internet Brands in 2007. Disagreements occurred between the developers and the new management and most of the vBulletin developers left Internet Brands in 2009. Darby and other former vBulletin developers began work on a new platform, XenForo.

=== Internet Brands lawsuits ===
One day before the scheduled release of the first public beta of XenForo in October 2010, Internet Brands announced that it would file a lawsuit against the XenForo team in the UK, claiming: copyright infringement of property acquired by Internet Brands, use of code in XenForo that was refactored from vBulletin code, breach of contract, and engaging in unfair business practices. Representatives stated that XenForo "unfairly stands on the shoulders of more than a decade of development", development which had become the property of Internet Brands through the acquisition. Internet Brands denied that the timing of the lawsuit was to coincide with the public beta. In November 2010, Internet Brands sued XenForo and Darby in California District Court in the United States, additionally claiming that Darby had not returned confidential information from Internet Brands regarding the vBulletin software. The XenForo team denied the claims.

On February 28, 2013, XenForo announced that the lawsuit had been settled between the parties in both the UK and the US. Although specific terms of the agreement are confidential, Internet Brands withdrew both the US and UK lawsuits. XenForo announced that all license holders with a valid license from June 19, 2012 would receive an additional 255 days of support and download access.

== Release history ==
Legend:
Unsupported
Supported
Latest version
Preview version
Future version

Version	Release date	Notable changes	Latest release	
1.0	March 8, 2011	Initial release	1.0.4	July 12, 2011
1.1	November 22, 2011	Thread prefixes, RTL, etc.	1.1.5	May 21, 2013
1.2	July 30, 2013	Template modification system, route filters (route changing), post edit history and logging	1.2.9	July 27, 2015
1.3	March 11, 2014	Custom BB codes, Google+/Twitter registration, user change logging, multi-quote, etc.	1.3.9	October 20, 2015
1.4	September 9, 2014	Selective quoting, sitemap XML generation, thread reply bans, custom help pages, poll improvements, new profile post features, etc.	1.4.13	August 30, 2016
1.5	August 18, 2015	Thread tagging, responsive admin control panel, two-step verification, floating notices, profile post comment improvements, etc.	1.5.24	May 29, 2019
2.0	November 28, 2017	New user interface, emoji support, what's new section, etc.	2.0.12	December 11, 2018
2.1	January 30, 2019	Push notifications, Emoji reactions, REST API, etc.	2.1.15	June 5, 2024
2.2	September 29, 2020	Progressive Web Application; question, suggestion and article thread types; profile post attachments, activity summary email, just-in-time registration etc.	2.2.16	June 5, 2024
2.3	July 4, 2024	Style variants with dark mode, improved performance, featured content, image optimization, SSO with OAuth2, Passkey support, trending content	2.3.7	July 15, 2025

== See also ==
- Comparison of Internet forum software
