= VBulletin =

Internet forum software

vBulletin
- Developer: MH Sub I, LLC d/b/a vBulletin
- Release: 2000; 26 years ago
- Stable release: 6.2.0 / 12 March 2026; 8 months ago
- Written in: PHP
- Platform: PHP, MySQL
- Type: Forum software
- License: Commercial proprietary software
- Website: vbulletin.com

vBulletin is a proprietary Internet forum software package sold by MH Sub I, LLC doing business as vBulletin (formerly Jelsoft Enterprises and vBulletin Solutions). It is written in PHP and uses a MariaDB or MySQL database server.

== History ==
vBulletin was first launched in 2000 by James Limm and John Percival. Its successor, vBulletin 2, was released in 2001. A third version was launched in 2004.

Internet Brands acquired the product from JelSoft in 2007.

vBulletin 4 was released in late 2009. The StyleVars system was added to draw CSS variables directly from the vBulletin Template code.

In July 2010, the BBC reported that there was a serious flaw in vBulletin software that allows anyone to easily access the database username and password.

In October 2010, Internet Brands sued three former employees, just as their new competing software XenForo was to be launched, as well as a second lawsuit in the United States claiming breach of contract, copyright infringement, and misappropriation of trade secrets. In May 2011 it was announced that vBulletin had abandoned an attempt at preventing XenForo doing business, and in 2013 the claims were dismissed.

vBulletin 5 was released in 2012.

In late 2017, a post by Technical Support Lead, Wayne Luke, confirmed that vBulletin 3 and vBulletin 4 were now considered to be "End of Life" software, with no further development of the series planned.

On 22 August 2023, vBulletin 6 was announced.

On 18 September 2023, Wayne Luke confirmed that the previously-community run modifications website, vBulletin.org, would be sunsetted and shut down on 24 August 2024; modification creators were advised to post their content on the main vbulletin.com website via the Social Groups feature, or to host them via other means.

== See also ==
- BBCode
- Comparison of Internet forum software
