= List of free and open-source web applications =

All web applications, both traditional and Web 2.0, are operated by software running somewhere. This is a list of free software which can be used to run alternative web applications. Also listed are similar proprietary web applications that users may be familiar with. Most of this software is server-side software, often running on a web server.

Application	Service	License	Requirements	Similar proprietary web application(s)
Collabora Online	Online office suite	MPLv2.0		Google Docs, Microsoft 365
PHPGroupware	Online office suite	GPLv2		Google Docs
eGroupware	Online office suite	GPLv2		Google Docs
Feng Office	Online office suite	AGPL		Google Docs
Gallery	Photo sharing	GPLv3	PHP + MySQL	flickr, Picasa
Piwigo	Photo sharing	GPL	PHP + MariaDB / MySQL	flickr, Picasa
OpenBroadcaster	Video streaming	AGPLv3+	MySQL	YouTube
Plumi	Video streaming	GPL | ZPL		YouTube
PeerTube	Video streaming	AGPLv3+		YouTube
Libre.fm	Music streaming	AGPLv3+	PostgreSQL or MySQL	last.fm
CiteSeerX	Bibliographic database	Apache	MySQL or PostgreSQL	SpringerLink
OpenStreetMap	Mapping	ODbL	MySQL or PostgreSQL	Google Maps
ownCloud	File sharing/sync, web calendar, online office suite etc.	AGPLv3		Dropbox, drop.io
Nextcloud	File sharing/sync, web calendar, online office suite etc.	AGPLv3+	PHP + MariaDB / MySQL / Oracle / PostgreSQL / SQLite	Dropbox, Google Drive, Microsoft 365, box
Seafile	File sharing/sync, web calendar, online office suite etc.	GPLv2		Dropbox, drop.io
Tahoe Least-Authority File Store	File sharing	GPLv2+		Dropbox, drop.io
iFolder	File sharing	GPLv2+		Dropbox, drop.io
AbiCollab	Online file editing	GPLv2	MySQL or PostgreSQL	Google Docs
Etherpad	Online file editing	Apache	MySQL or PostgreSQL	Google Docs
Eucalyptus (computing)	Virtual machine provisioning	GPLv3		Amazon EC2
OpenNebula	Virtual machine provisioning	Apache	SQLite3	Amazon EC2
DokuWiki	Wiki	GPLv2		Wikispaces
MediaWiki	Wiki	GPLv2+	MySQL or PostgreSQL	Wikispaces
TiddlyWiki	Wiki	BSD license	Web browser	Evernote, Microsoft OneNote
Open Journal Systems	Publication management	GPLv2	MySQL or PostgreSQL	
WordPress	Blogging	GPLv2	PHP + MariaDB / MySQL	blogger.com
LiveJournal	Blogging	GPLv2+		blogger.com
Ghost	Blogging	MIT License	JavaScript, node.js	blogger.com
GNU Social	Distributed social network	AGPLv3	MySQL or PostgreSQL	Twitter
Mastodon	Distributed social network	AGPLv3	PostgreSQL	Twitter
Friendica	Distributed social network	MIT		Facebook
Diaspora	Distributed social network	AGPL		Facebook
BuddyPress	Distributed social network	GPL	WordPress	Facebook
Elgg	Distributed social network	GPLv2 / MIT		Facebook
Duolicious	Social network	AGPLv3	PostgreSQL	OkCupid, Tinder
pump.io	Social aggregation	Apache		FriendFeed
Meneame	Social news	AGPLv3		Digg
Mixx	Social news			Digg
Scuttle	Social bookmarking			Delicious
Connotea (discontinued)	Social bookmarking			Delicious
Ma.gnolia 2 (discontinued)	Social bookmarking			Delicious
AppScale	Virtual web hosting	BSD		Google AppEngine
Roundcube	Web mail	GPLv3+ with exceptions for skins and plugins		Gmail, Hotmail
IMP	Web mail	GPLv2	IMAP server	Gmail, Hotmail
Squirrelmail	Web mail	GPLv2		Gmail, Hotmail
Mailman	Mailing lists	GPL		Google Groups, Yahoo Groups
FluxBB	Forum	GPLv2		
phpBB	Forum	GPLv2		
MyBB	Forum	GNU LGPL		
Phorum	Forum	Phorum 2.0		
Vanilla	Forum	GPLv2		
Discourse	Forum	GPLv2+		
LimeSurvey	Internet survey	GPLv2		SurveyMonkey, Google Form creator
Tiny Tiny RSS	RSS reader	GPLv3		Google Reader
Apertium	Translation	GPLv2		Google Translate
EyeOS (version 2.5 and earlier)	Homepage	AGPLv3		iGoogle
OpenCroquet	Virtual world	MIT		SecondLife
OpenSimulator	Virtual world	BSD		SecondLife
bitwarden	Password manager	GPLv3, AGPLv3	node.js	Dashlane, LastPass
Mattermost	Web chat	MIT, AGPLv3, Apache License 2.0		Slack
Element	Web chat	Apache License 2.0		Slack

== See also ==
- List of AGPL web applications
