= FUDforum =

Free Internet forum software

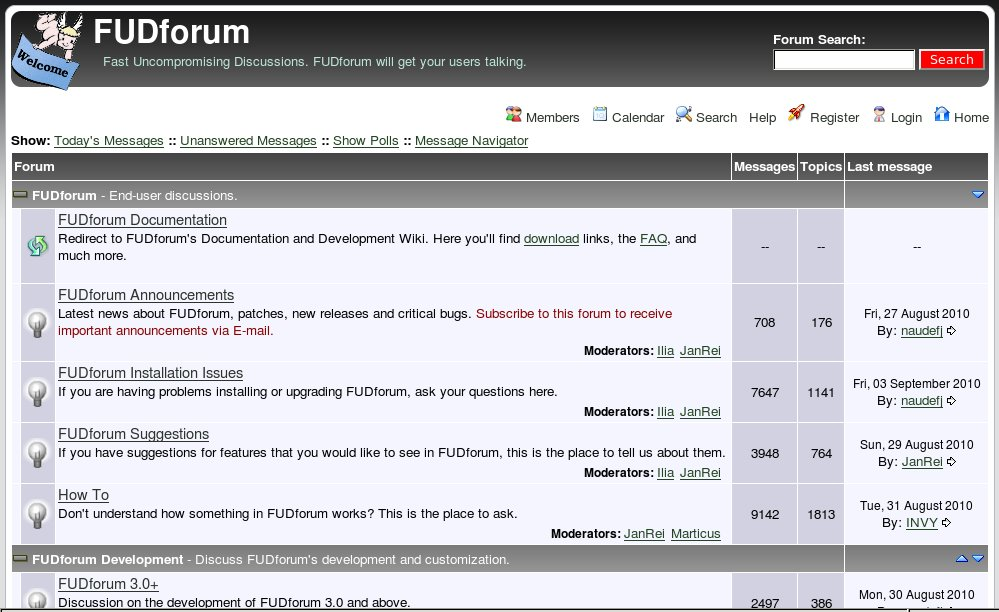
- Screenshot of a typical FUDforum message board.
- Original author: Ilia Alshanetsky
- Developer: Community (Advanced Internet Designs Inc.)
- Initial release: 2001; 25 years ago
- Stable release: 3.2.0 / 2025-01-19; 14 months ago
- Written in: PHP
- Operating system: Any
- Platform: Cross-platform
- Available in: Multilingual (English and 50+ other languages)
- Type: Forum software Mailing list archiver
- License: GPL v2.0 only
- Website: Official website at the Wayback Machine (archived 2024-09-15)
- Repository: github.com/fudforum/FUDforum

FUDforum is a free and open-source Internet forum software, originally produced by Advanced Internet Designs Inc., that is now maintained by the user community. The name "FUDforum" is an abbreviation of Fast Uncompromising Discussion forum. It is comparable to other forum software. FUDforum is customizable and has a large feature set relative to other forum packages.

FUDforum runs on a number of operating systems that are able to support the PHP programming language, including Unix, Linux and Windows systems. The interface is based on HTML5 with CSS, jQuery and AJAX.

The code is released under the General Public License v2.0 only and Internet sites can use the software royalty-free.

== History ==
FUDforum was originally developed by Ilia Alshanetsky. The first version of FUDforum was released in 2001. Versions 2.8.0 and above are developed and supported by the community.

The 10 year anniversary release, FUDforum 3.0.3, was released on 10 September 2011.

== Requirements ==
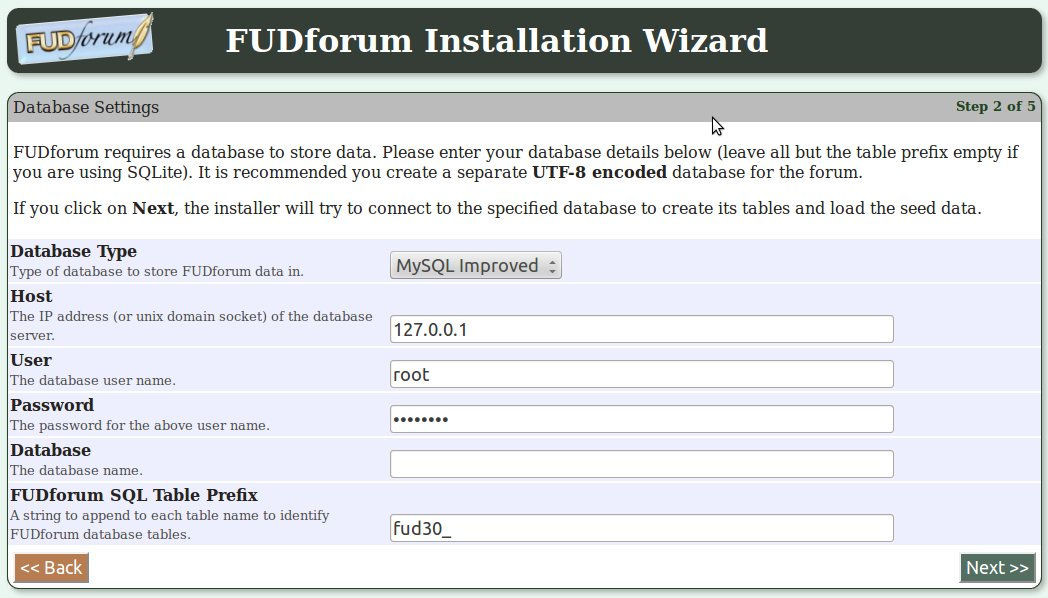
The FUDforum installation wizard

FUDforum requires the following components to function:

- A web server that will run PHP like the Apache Web Server or Microsoft's Internet Information Services;
- PHP versions 7.4 or higher;
- A database like MySQL, Oracle or PostgreSQL.

== Preconfigured versions ==
Two special pre-configured versions of FUDforum are available (doesn't require manual installation):

- FUDforum2Go, a small-footprint version of FUDforum for Microsoft Windows that can run from a USB stick, CD-Rom or from any folder on a PC's hard disk. FUDforum2Go is based on Server2Go.
- Turnkey FUDforum is a virtual appliance based on the TurnKey Linux Virtual Appliance Library, that can be deployed in the cloud or on a virtual machine infrastructure like VMWare, Xen or VirtualBox.

== Features ==
Some of FUDforum's features include:

- The software supports an unlimited number of members, forums, posts, threads and attachments.
- Ability to load USENET and E-mail list messages and sync forum replies back to these groups and lists.
- Customizable theme system based on templates.
- Translated into over 50 languages on translatewiki.net (including German, French, Dutch, Spanish, Portuguese and several other languages).
- Search engine friendly URLs
- Flood control and Captcha spam protection.
- Blacklisting of users and IP blocking.
- Messages can be stored within the database or on filesystem for extra performance.
- Topics can be listed in flat or threaded mode.
- User Avatars.
- Private messaging system.
- Poll creation.
- Built-in search engine.
- RSS-feed syndication.
- Message and Quick Reply editors that support BBCode, HTML, plain text and Smilies.
- User, Moderator and Admin Control Panels.
- A permission based user/group management system.
- A plugin system that can be used to extend the forum's functionality.
- A forum calendar.
- Custom profile fields.

== Integration ==
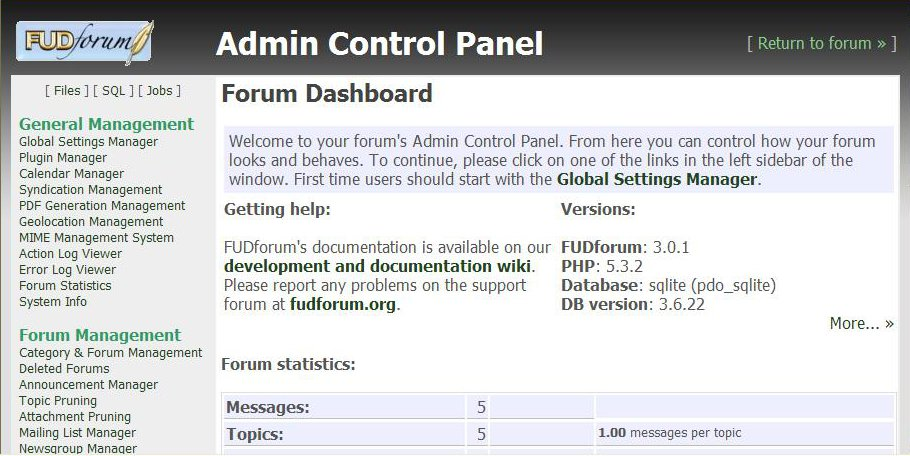
FUDforum's Admin Control Panel.

A MediaWiki extension and Drupal CMS module is available to provide FUDforum integration. FUDforum can also be integrated with systems like DokuWiki and eGroupWare (not with eGroupware version 1.6).

Custom integration of third-party tools can be achieved via FUDforum's provided API, called FUDAPI.

== Conversion scripts ==
Several conversion scripts are provided to convert other bulletin board and forum software to FUDforum. They include:

- IkonBoard;
- Invision Board;
- OpenBB;
- Phorum;
- phpBB;
- punBB;
- Sporum;
- VBulletin;
- WoltLab Burning Board;
- WWWBoard;
- XMB;
- Yabb and Yabb DC.

== See also ==
- Comparison of Internet forum software
- Integrated Content Management Systems: Drupal, MediaWiki and eGroupWare.
