= Hong Kong Discuss Forum =

Internet forum based in Hong Kong

- Screenshot Screenshot of Hong Kong Discuss Forum (2009-8-16)
- Website type: Internet Forum
- Available in: Traditional Chinese, Cantonese
- Owner: Mingly Corporation
- Website: discuss.com.hk
- Commercial: Yes
- Registration: Optional
- Launched: October 14, 2003; 22 years ago
- Current status: Online

The Hong Kong Discuss Forum (Chinese: 香港討論區, commonly known as DISCUSS) is a major Internet forum based in Hong Kong. As of June 14, 2018, it is rated the sixth most frequently visited website in Hong Kong.

With the slogan, "DISCUSS, Hong Kong No.1" (香討，香港No.1), which is translated to "champion" in Chinese, the Hong Kong Discuss Forum is criticized by members of "Hong Kong Forum".

== History ==
=== 2003–2004: Foundation and establishments ===
The Hong Kong Discuss Forum was founded on February 17, 2003. It is an Internet Forum that adopted the PHP Bulletin Board (phpBB) 2.06 forum system. Member registration began on February 22, 2003. On July 31, 2003, the 馬照跑、波照踢 (Horse racing and soccer) sections were added as gambling on soccer became legal. There few forums in Hong Kong, and the addition of a new section attracted more people to the forum. On January 1, 2004, the "Fashion" section was added to the forum. On 14 October 2003, the site of the forum was moved to www.discuss.com.hk, and the name of the forum was changed to "Hong Kong Discuss Forum".

On 2 February 2004, www.discuss.com.hk became a permanent domain. In March 2004, the forum was moved to a more stable server. A newer system, Discuz! 3.0, was adopted in an attempt to obtain reliable technical support.

=== Simplified Chinese Translation ===
On February 20, a Traditional Chinese to Simplified Chinese Translator was installed on the forum. Users could translate posts by a click, but the translations are not always correct. There are some characters that were not translated; also there are some words that are incorrect. This can be found on any post on the forum.

=== Partnership with Uwants Forum ===
In December 2007, Hong Kong Discuss Forum and Uwants Forum began a partnership.

=== Blockade by PRC Government ===
Since 2007, the PRC Government has blocked the Hong Kong Discuss Forum, preventing citizens of the country from visiting the website. Users there have to browse by proxy on CHINA.

== Owner ==
On 1 December 2017, Mingly Corporation acquired parent company "Networld Technology Limited", and became one of the major investors.

== Users ==
In 2018, according to Alexa Internet, Hong Kong Discuss Forum ranks as the fourth most visited website in Hong Kong, and the eighth most visited website in neighbouring Macau. Additionally, it is also within the top 100 most visited websites globally.

The forum claims to be politically neutral and allow free speech. However, rights of users can be easily and readily prohibited, or down-graded. Users can be banned from posting or replying to any messages if the user posts anti-communist messages, messages against the Hong Kong government's public policies, or against any of the post-communist or communist peripheral organizations in Hong Kong. Many post-communist messages are placed at the default top of columns by the administrators which are intentionally twisting or misinterpreting history or news to make them favorable to the PRC communists.

Recent members' responses was that the forum was flooded with messages from the "Fifty cents Gangs" (五毛黨, the nickname of the peripheral organization of PRC communist party specially trained to manipulate communication over the Internet. They are officially named "Internet Modulators" ( (網絡評論員) and gained that nickname from the rumor that they can earn 50 cents on every post they send), who post massive numbers of messages as described above. The latest news reveals the suspicion that members of iProA, a communist peripheral organization in Hong Kong, is organizing all these activities in Hong Kong. They are funded to distribute these messages in cyber space, online forums, social media, YouTube, and more., in order to "brain-wash" the people of Hong Kong. Moreover, Hong Kong government officials are suspected of funding this organization indirectly by employing their services or unfairly contracting government services to the organization.

== Alexa Ranking ==
Time	Alexa Ranking	Reference
2 August 2012	▲2,554	
1 April 2014	▼3,128	
19 December 2016	▲HK: 7; Global: 881	
