= Substack =

American online newsletter platform

Substack Inc.
- Website type: Subscription platform
- Headquarters: San Francisco, California, U.S.
- Creators: Chris Best; Hamish McKenzie; Jairaj Sethi
- Revenue: US$9 million (2021)
- Employees: 94 (June 2022)
- Website: substack.com
- Commercial: Yes
- Launched: 2017; 9 years ago
- Current status: Live

Substack is an American online platform that provides publishing, payment, analytics, and design infrastructure to support subscription-based content, including newsletters, podcasts, and video. It allows writers to send digital content directly to subscribers. Founded in 2017, Substack is headquartered in San Francisco. The company has been credited with expanding opportunities for independent publishing and greater editorial autonomy for writers, while also facing criticism for its permissive content moderation policies.

== History ==
Substack was founded in 2017 by Chris Best, the co-founder of Kik Messenger; Jairaj Sethi, a head of platform and principal developer at Kik Messenger; and Hamish McKenzie, a former PandoDaily tech reporter. Best and McKenzie have said Ben Thompson's Stratechery, a subscription-based tech and media newsletter, was a major inspiration for their platform. Best acts as CEO of the company.

In 2019, Substack added support for podcasts and discussion threads among newsletter subscribers.

By November 2021, the platform said it had more than 500,000 paying subscribers, representing over one million subscriptions.

In January 2022, Substack announced that it would begin private beta testing of video functionality on its platform. In November, it launched Substack Chat, where content creators could create private group chats with subscribers. The same year, the company launched the Substack Reader app for iOS, followed by an Android version six months later.

In April 2023, Elon Musk spoke with Substack's leadership about purchasing the platform, but his offer was rejected. The same month, Substack implemented a Notes feature, which allows users to publish and repost short-form content. This microblogging feature has been compared to Twitter, and many outlets considered it a response to changes at Twitter under Musk's ownership. Musk criticized Substack Notes, and Twitter began censoring links to Substack.

In November 2023, Substack introduced new video creating and editing tools, and content creators started launching original shows on the platform.

In April 2024, Substack partnered with Spotify to enable podcasters to distribute episodes on both platforms and added new editing features for podcasts. In June 2024, Substack announced a year-long development initiative for TikTok creators called Creator Studio, and added five-minute video capabilities to the chat function. Video was also added to Notes.

By November 2024, Substack had four million paid subscriptions.

Substack added livestreaming options for creators in September 2024. Following this and the January 2025 restrictions on TikTok in the United States, Substack announced the ability to post and monetize videos directly through the Substack app in February 2025. In March 2025, Substack announced that it had five million paid subscriptions. In June, independent journalist Eric Newcomer reported that Substack was in talks to raise a new funding round. The New York Times later reported that Substack had raised $100 million, valuing the company at $1.1 billion. The investors in this round were Andreessen Horowitz, BOND, The Chernin Group, Skims, and Klutch Sports Group. In July 2025, The New York Times reported that Substack was investing heavily in social-network features and planned to expand advertising.

In January 2026, the company announced Substack TV, a standalone app for Apple TV and Google TV that will support videos and livestreams. According to TheWrap, the beta app allows Substack subscribers to watch creators' video posts and livestreams. The app can be used by both free and paid Substack subscribers, with access to content based on subscription tiers.

== Content ==
Substack users include journalists, subject-matter experts, and media platforms. New York Times columnist Mike Isaac argued in 2019 that companies like Substack see newsletters as a stabler means to maintain readers through more direct connection with writers. In 2020, The New Republic said there was a dearth of local news newsletters, especially in contrast to the large number of national-level political newsletters.

In late 2020, many journalists and reporters were joining the platform, driven in part by the long-term decline in traditional media (there were half as many newsroom jobs in 2019 as in 2004 in the US). Around that time, The New Yorker wrote that while "Substack has advertised itself as a friendly home for journalism ... few of its newsletters publish original reporting; the majority offer personal writing, opinion pieces, research, and analysis." It called Substack's content moderation policy "lightweight", with rules against "harassment, threats, spam, pornography, and calls for violence; moderation decisions are made by the founders".

Among the high-profile writers who had used the platform by 2021 were journalist and author Glenn Greenwald; economist Paul Krugman; journalist Seymour Hersh; culture critic Anne Helen Petersen; music essayist Robert Christgau; and food writer Alison Roman.

In 2026, Andrew Tate joined Substack, quickly rising to the #1 spot in the news category.

== Finances ==
Authors can decide to make subscribing to their newsletter free or paid, and to make specific posts publicly available to non-subscribers. As of 2020, the minimum subscription fee was $5/month or $30/year, and Substack usually takes a 10% cut from subscription payments. In October 2025, Substack reported that 50,000 creators were earning money on its platform, of whom at least 50 were making more than $1 million. Substack earns no revenue from advertisements placed by publishers. In February 2019, the platform began allowing creators to monetize podcasts. Substack reported 11,000 paid subscribers as of 2018, rising to 50,000 in 2019.

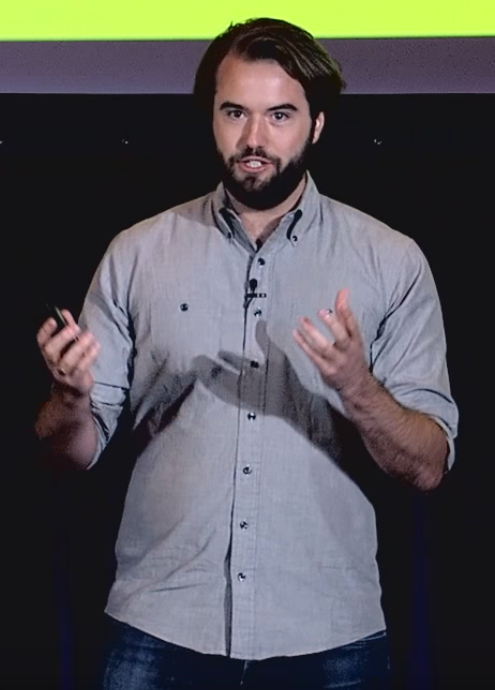
Chris Best discussing mobile advertising in 2015

Substack raised an initial seed round in 2018 from investors including The Chernin Group, Zhen Fund, Twitch CEO Emmett Shear, and Zynga co-founder Justin Waldron. Andreessen Horowitz provided $15.3 million in Series A funding in 2019, some of which went to bringing high-profile writers into Substack's network. Substack has provided some content creators with advances to start working on their platform.

In 2019, the site provided a fellowship to some writers, which included a $3,000 stipend and a one-day workshop in San Francisco. The decline of sports-oriented publications such as Sports Illustrated, Deadspin, and SB Nation, coupled with the onset of the COVID-19 pandemic, led to a surge in sports journalists moving to write on Substack in 2019 and 2020. Substack competes with subscription site The Athletic in this submarket, so McKenzie says the company recruits less strongly in that market. In 2020, after the onset of the pandemic, Substack extended grants of $1,000–$3,000 to over 40 writers to begin working on the platform. It expanded into comics content in 2021 and signed creators including Saladin Ahmed, Jonathan Hickman, Lee Knox Ostertag, Scott Snyder, and James Tynion IV, paying them while keeping their subscription revenue. After their first year, Substack will take 10 percent of subscription revenue.

Substack's founders reached out to a small pool of writers in 2017 to acquire its first creators. Bill Bishop was among the first to put his newsletter, Sinocism, on Substack, offering its daily content for $11 a month or $118 a year. As of 2019, Bishop's Sinocism was the top-paid newsletter on the service. By late 2020, the conservative newsletter The Dispatch became the top Substack user, with more than 100,000 subscribers and over $2 million in first-year revenue, according to founder Stephen F. Hayes. In May 2021, Substack acquired Brooklyn-based startup People & Company. In August 2020, Substack reported that over 100,000 users were paying for at least one newsletter. As of August 2021, Substack had more than 250,000 paying subscribers and its top ten publishers were making $7 million in annualized revenue. In April 2022, The New York Times reported Substack may be valued at $650 million. Substack dropped an effort to raise money in May 2022. The company had aimed to raise between $75 million and $100 million.

== Programs ==
In March 2021, Substack revealed that it had been experimenting with a revenue sharing program called Substack Pro, which paid advances for writers to create publications on its platform, but received criticism for not disclosing which writers were part of Substack Pro. This program ended in 2022.

Substack provides legal advice to its writers through its program, Substack Defender. Lawyers provide a legal review of stories before they are published, and provide advice surrounding cease-and-desist letters related to writers' work. Substack has committed to covering up to $1 million in fees for cases accepted by Defender lawyers. The program was expanded in 2025 to include a partnership with the Foundation for Individual Rights and Expression.

== Reception and controversies ==
=== Independent publishing and business model ===
Substack allows writers to publish independently, charge readers for subscriptions, and retain control of their mailing lists. A 2022 study published by the Columbia Journalism Review, based on interviews with 52 journalists, found that writers used the platform for different purposes. Some used newsletters to build an audience alongside their regular work, while others saw Substack as an alternative to traditional media organizations. Journalists who had lost their jobs sometimes used the platform to continue publishing while looking for other opportunities. The study also found that attracting paying subscribers and earning a reliable income could be difficult, particularly for writers without an established audience.

Substack takes a 10% share of paid subscription revenue, a fee that some writers have found increasingly expensive as their audiences grow. In May 2026, The Verge reported that several publishers had moved to competing services such as Ghost and Beehiiv, citing lower costs and greater control over their websites. Others objected to Substack's growing emphasis on social networking features. Although writers can export their email subscribers, they cannot transfer followers gained through the platform's Notes feature.

=== Content moderation ===
Substack has maintained a relatively permissive approach to content moderation. Its founders have argued that controversial views should be challenged through public debate rather than removed from the platform. The policy has attracted writers who favor fewer restrictions on speech, but has also prompted criticism over the company's responsibility for the material it hosts.

During the COVID-19 pandemic, Substack faced criticism for hosting writers who promoted vaccine misinformation after other platforms had restricted similar content. The company's founders defended their approach, arguing in favor of open debate over censorship.

The debate intensified in late 2023 after The Atlantic reported finding numerous white supremacist and neo-Nazi newsletters on Substack, some of which offered paid subscriptions. Around 250 writers signed an open letter urging the company to ban accounts promoting white nationalism. Others defended its moderation policy. Bari Weiss and Richard Dawkins were among those who endorsed a post by Substack writer Elle Griffin arguing that readers and individual publishers, rather than the platform, should decide what material to engage with. Matthew Yglesias also questioned whether the extent of extremist content warranted stricter moderation rules.

In January 2024, Substack removed five newsletters that it said had violated its existing content rules, but declined to introduce a broader ban on extremist views. The decision failed to satisfy several critics. Casey Newton, Molly White, and Ryan Broderick were among the writers who left the platform during the controversy.

In February 2026, an investigation by The Guardian found that newsletters promoting Nazi ideology, white supremacy, and antisemitism continued to offer paid subscriptions on Substack, from which the company received a share of the revenue. The investigation also found that Substack's recommendation system directed the newspaper's test account toward other profiles featuring similar extremist content. Substack did not respond to the newspaper's request for comment.

=== Privacy and security incidents ===
In July 2020, Substack accidentally exposed users' email addresses when it sent a privacy policy update using the "cc" field instead of "bcc". The company acknowledged the mistake and apologized.

In February 2026, Substack disclosed a data breach dating back to October 2025. An unauthorized party had accessed user information, including email addresses, phone numbers, and internal metadata. The company said it discovered the breach on February 3, 2026, and had since addressed the vulnerability. It did not initially disclose how many users were affected.

== See also ==
- Beehive Forum
- Blogger
- Ghost
- Medium
- WordPress
