= Translatewiki.net =

Website for translating free software

translatewiki.net
- Original author: Niklas Laxström
- Developers: Niklas Laxström, Siebrand Mazeland
- Release: July 2006 (alpha: 2005)
- Stable release: Continuous development / Monthly MLEB release
- Engine: MediaWiki
- Operating system: Cross-platform
- Available in: 300 languages
- Type: Computer-assisted translation
- License: GPL; free service
- Website: translatewiki.net; documentation

translatewiki.net, formerly named Betawiki, is a web-based translation platform powered by the Translate extension for MediaWiki. It can be used to translate various kinds of texts but is commonly used for creating localisations for software interfaces.

It has about 17,000 translators and over 120,000 messages to translate from over 50 projects, including MediaWiki, OpenStreetMap, Encyclopedia of Life and MantisBT.

== Features ==
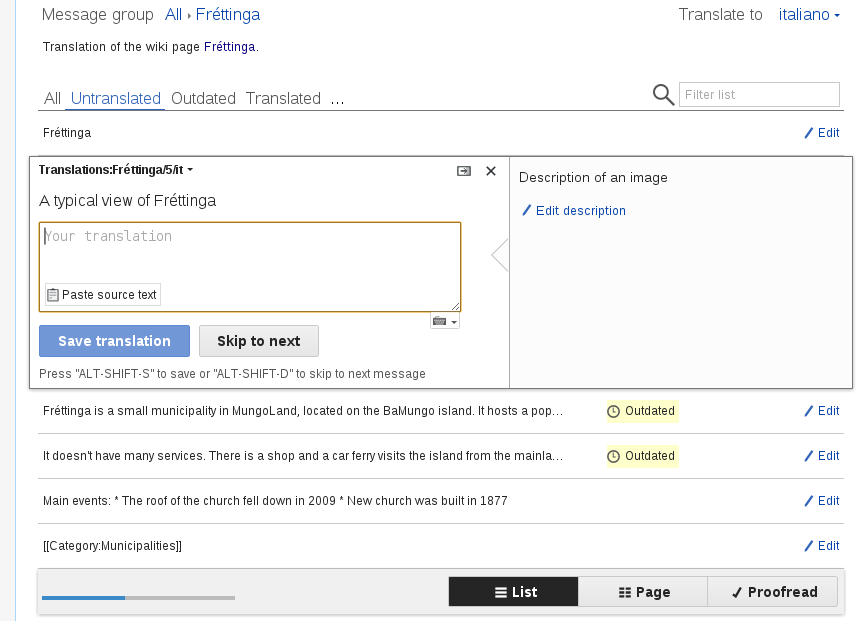
User interface, from the Translate manual

Translatewiki.net is a wiki and so has a relatively low barrier to entry.

Translations are synchronised between a version control system and translatable wiki pages.

For MediaWiki on Wikimedia Foundation projects, new localisations may reach live sites within a day (sometimes called "continuous translation" or "continuous localization").

The translation editor provides various features for machine-assisted translation, such as

- message documentation, also known as "context",
- suggestions from a text corpus and machine translation,
- checking translations for common syntax mistakes,
- translation status of messages.

In the early 2010s, translatewiki.net was also a Semantic MediaWiki, part of the semantic web.

== History ==
Translatewiki.net was made available by Niklas Laxström as localisation platform for all languages of MediaWiki before he started university, around June 2006.

Besides translation, it was developed with the characteristics of an integrated development environment for MediaWiki (Nukawiki in 2005), with a focus on improvement of internationalisation features. For a while it was named BetaWiki.

At the end of 2007 Siebrand Mazeland joined the management of the website, which was moved to the current domain translatewiki.net.

In April 2008, it already supported over 100 languages for MediaWiki and 200 of its extensions, "making it one of the most translated software projects ever", as well as FreeCol. Since then, while being an independent volunteer project, it has been recognised as a major player in the global success of MediaWiki and the Wikimedia projects powered by it, like Wikipedia, in over 280 languages.

Niklas Laxström presents, Translating the wiki way: Simple, fast, fun, on Wikimania in 2012.

In 2009 it was improved by a Google Summer of Code project by Niklas Laxström. In 2011 proofreading features were introduced. In 2012, its translation memory engine expanded to all Wikimedia projects using Translate.

In 2013, the Translate platform underwent a major revamp through the "Translate User eXperience" project, or "TUX", including "changes in navigation, editor look and feel, translation area, filters, search, and color & style".

In 2019, translatewiki.net became an associated project of Software in the Public Interest (SPI).

== Supported formats ==
Some of the natively supported formats follow. More can be added with some customisation.

- Android string resources
- AMD i18n bundle
- Dtd
- GNU Gettext
- INI
- Java properties
- JavaScript
- JSON
- MediaWiki interface and pages
- PHP files
- PythonSingle
- XLIFF (partial, in beta)
- YAML

== Notable uses ==
- Encyclopedia of Life
- Etherpad
- FUDforum
- FreeCol
- Kiwix
- MantisBT
- MediaWiki and MediaWiki extensions
- OpenStreetMap
- pywikibot
- Wikipedia mobile apps

Some projects use translatewiki.net's software (the Translate extension) in a self-hosted fashion:

- Gentoo Linux documentation
- Joomla documentation
- KDE documentation
- Kiwix website
- Pandora documentation
- Simple Machines Forum documentation
