= Office 2.0 Conference =

The Office 2.0 Conference is an annual conference coordinated by Ismael Ghalimi on the subject of Office 2.0, "focused heavily on using collaborative Web technologies to increase productivity gains and business agility". The first conference was in 2006 and the next is scheduled for 2009.

U.S. Trademark 77,010,112 applies to the term this context and is owned by Ghalimi's Monolab, Inc.

== See also ==
- Cloud computing
- Online office suite
- Software as a service
