= Discuz! =

Internet forum software

- Original author: Dai Zhikang
- Developer: Tencent
- Initial release: March 2002
- Stable release: X3.5 (December 31, 2022; 3 years ago) [±]
- Written in: PHP
- Available in: Chinese (simplified and traditional)
- Type: Internet forum
- License: proprietary, free for non-commercial use
- Website: www.discuz.vip

Discuz! is an Internet forum software written in PHP and developed by Comsenz Technology Co., Ltd (Chinese: 康盛创想). It supports MySQL and PostgreSQL databases. It is the most popular Internet forum program used in China.

Discuz! is free of charge for private uses. A license that allows commercial use costs about 3000 RMB. The software is officially available in Chinese. An English version was also being officially developed, but development stopped due to financial reasons. There are unofficial English and other language versions provided by certain websites.

== History ==
Based on another Internet forum program called "Asia XMB" in its English version, based on the "XMB forum", Discuz! was developed by Dai Zhikang (Chinese: 戴志康; nickname: Crossday) as "Crossday Bulletin (CDB)" in March 2002. It was renamed "Discuz!" with its 15 October 2002 release. In February 2003, the Comsenz Technology Co., Ltd. was formed.

Since June 2003, there has been a free version as well as a commercial version. With version 6.1.0, the software depends on an existing UCenter installation, which is an interface to join all the Comsenz products in the website. It is a user management software, so information like private messages can be used in all the Comsenz products on the same website. Another innovation is the integration of the Chinese marketing service provider Insenz. In 2006, Discuz! was used by a vast majority of Chinese bulletin board system users. That year, Chen Yupeng published research about the "societal motivation" of Discuz!. Other research has been carried out about Discuz! in the field of education.

Comsenz was acquired by Tencent in August 2010. Discuz! X 1.0 was developed in 2010, combining with other SNSs, web portals, groups and open platforms produced by the company.

== See also ==
- Comparison of Internet forum software
