= Beehive Forum =

Internet forum software

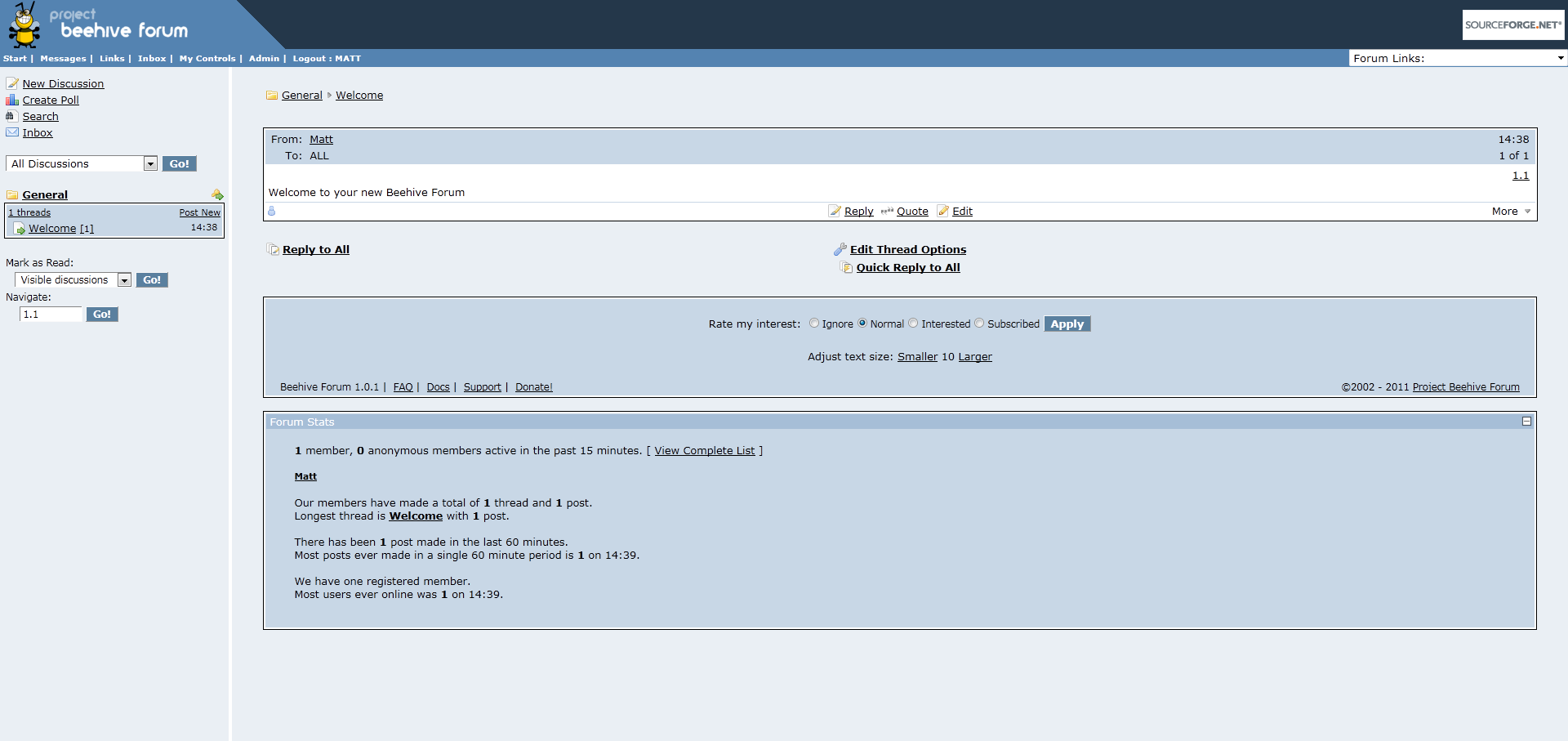
- Stable release: 1.5.2 / November 5, 2016
- Operating system: Platform Independent
- Platform: PHP/MySQL
- Type: Internet forum software
- License: GPL
- Website: www.beehiveforum.co.uk
- Repository: BeehiveForum on GitHub

Beehive Forum is a free and open-source forum system using the PHP scripting language and MySQL database software.

The main difference between Beehive and most other forum software is its frame-based interface which lists discussion titles on the left and displays their contents on the right.

== Features ==
Other features which differentiate Beehive from most forums include:

- Targeted replies to specific users and/or posts.
- Safe HTML posting (malicious code is stripped out), rather than BBCode, via WYSIWYG editor, helper toolbar, or manual typing.
- A relationship system, allowing users to ignore users and/or signatures that they dislike.
- Powerful forum-wide and per-user word filtering, including a regular expression option.
- A flexible polling system, allowing public or private ballot, grouped answers, and different result modes.
- A built-in "light mode" that allows basic forum access from PDAs and web-enabled mobilephones.

Beehive is used by the popular UK technology website The Inquirer on the Hermits Cave Message Board.

== Security and vulnerabilities ==
In May 2007, Beehive Forum was selected as one of the most secure forums from a selection of 10 open-source software tested by Dragos Lungu Dot Com.

On 28 November 2007, Nick Bennet and Robert Brown of Symantec Corporation discovered a security flaw related to Beehive's database input handling. The vulnerability could "allow a remote user to execute SQL injection attacks". The flaw affected all versions of the software up to 0.7.1. The Beehive Forum team responded very rapidly with a fix released, in the form of version 0.8 of the software, later that day.

== Reviews ==
- Review of Beehive 0.5 by ExtremeTech
- Review of Beehive 0.6.3 by Forum Software Reviews

== See also ==
- Comparison of Internet forum software
