= Phorum =

Internet forum software

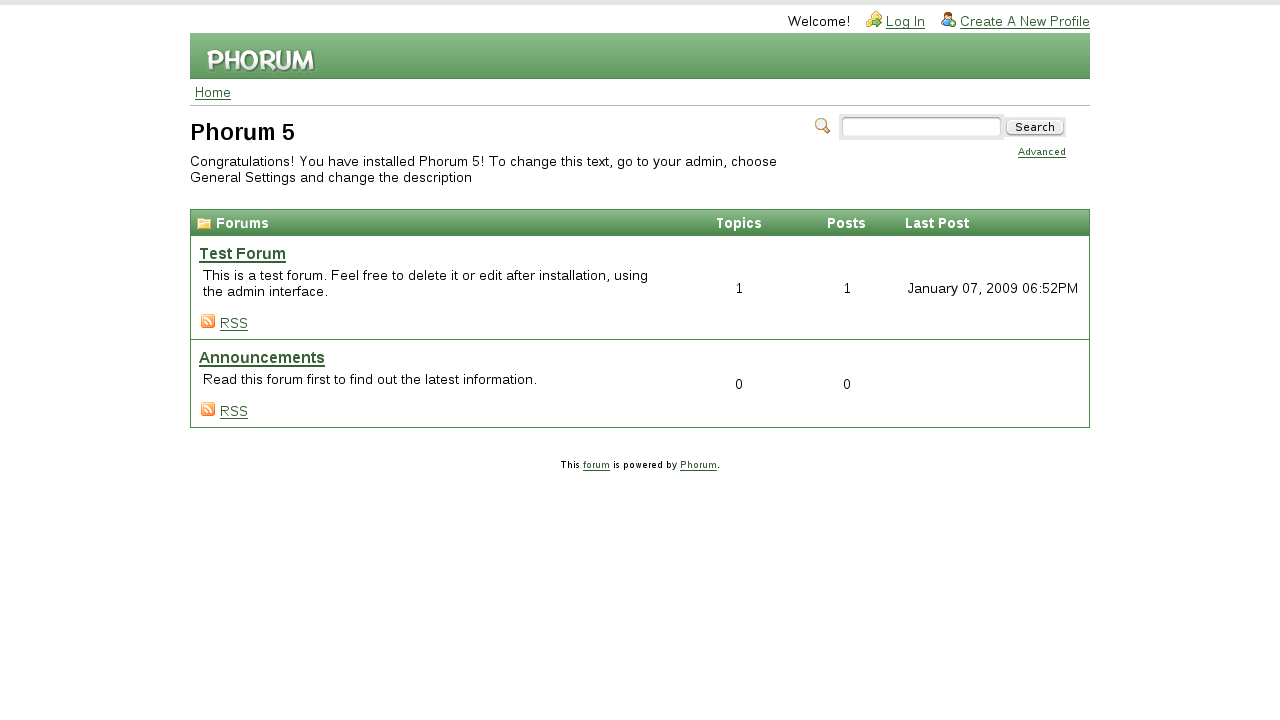
- Phorum Screen Shot
- Original author: Brian Moon
- Developer: Phorum Development Team
- Release: April 1998; 28 years ago
- Stable release: 5.2.23 / 31 January 2017; 9 years ago
- Written in: PHP
- Type: Forum software
- License: Phorum Licence 2 (BSD like)
- Website: phorum.org
- Repository: github.com/Phorum/Core

Phorum is an open-source message board system written in PHP.

== History ==
In April 1998, Brian Moon developed the initial scripts that would meet the basic forum needs of Dealmac, a small part time web based enterprise Moon was working on in his spare time with a number of others. With 30 days of testing, the code was prepared enough to put into production. It was named WebThreads, though this name was later found to collide with another, similar product. The name Phorum came from combining "PHP" and "forum". It was released under the GPL, though it would later be changed to the Phorum license, a BSD style license.

As Dealmac grew, the demands for the software grew. Moon had already begun writing Phorum 2.0. However, upon a review of the code, 2.0 was clearly not able to scale to Dealmac's needs. Dealmac hiring Moon to create what would become Phorum 3.0. The site owners were very open to open source. Initially, Phorum 3 was developed primarily by Moon with some help from Jason Birch of Bar-None Drinks. Moon announced the release of Phorum 3.0 on 28 July 1999 using version 3 of PHP and supporting both a MySQL and PostgresSQL backend databases.

In 2000, Dan Langille joined the Phorum team and has concentrated on maintaining the PostgreSQL code.

In 2001, Thomas Seifert of MySnip.de came on board, contributing an internal user system in Phorum. Previously, Phorum had relied on external user systems for user management.

Version 4 was never realized due to several problems with the direction of the code. Moon and Seifert instead started version 5, which was focused on speed and extensibility. This release made the product comparable to other offerings.

In September 2005, Maurice Makaay of Gitaar.net joined the Phorum team, contributing an easier to use message posting system and code for improving the Phorum module system. The Phorum module system provides a very flexible solution for implementing extra features and a lot of new features have been implemented as easy to install and use modules. The first production release of Phorum 5, version 5.0.9, was made in September 2004.

=== Latest release ===
Phorum 5.2 was announced as stable in January 2008 after two years of development. As of June 2019 it is the latest minor release. Key enhancements introduced with 5.2 included a new template which is totally based on XHTML and the addition of a publicly documented API for allowing other applications to integrate with Phorum.

== Adoption ==
Phorum at one point in the 2000s was used to provide such websites MySQL forums. Sheffield Hallam university School of Mathematics attempted to use a web-based discussion forum for student communication but utilization proved poor in practice and e-mail based lists were found to be more productive.

== See also ==
- Comparison of Internet forum software
