= Online office suite =

Type of office suite software

An online office suite, online productivity suite or cloud office suite is an office suite offered in the form of a web application, accessed online using a web browser. This allows people to work together worldwide and at any time, thereby leading to web-based collaboration and virtual teamwork. Some online office suites can be installed either on-premise or online and some are offered only as online as a software as a service. Some versions can be free of charge, some have a subscription fee. Some online office suites can run as progressive web applications which no longer require an online connection to function. Online office suites exist as both open-source and proprietary software.

== Components ==
Online office suites typically includes this base set of applications

- Word processor
- Spreadsheet
- Presentation program

Other frequently available applications

- Webmail
- Calendar
- Instant messaging including voice and video conferencing

Publishing applications

- Content management system
- Web portal
- Wiki
- Blog
- Forums

Other applications

- Diagramming
- Raster graphics editor
- Data management
- Project management
- Customer relationship management
- Enterprise resource planning
- Accounting
- Maps
- Notetaking
- News

== Advantages and disadvantages ==
Advantages and disadvantages between locally installed office suites and online office suites vary significantly, any of these could be present significant limitations and/or unexpected costs, here are some considerations:

- Any web browser, any device type: online office suites may be expected to provide the ability for a group of people to collaboratively edit a document from any device, anywhere, without the requirement for a specific device, web browser, add-ons (extensions/plugins) or device operating system.
- Near complete desktop functionality: they may be expected to provide the same functionality as a desktop application, such as menu options, display (rendering) of documents, not prompting users to use a desktop office suite for functionality that is missing, as they may not have a compatible device when they need it.
- Compatibility with common file formats: it may be expected that an online office suite can edit and save files in a broad variety of formats, such as Microsoft XML, OpenDocument, PDF, CSV, EPUB or older Microsoft formats.
- Ongoing subscription costs: online office suites that require an ongoing subscription can add up to cost more than purchasing a software license for a locally installed office suite, especially if the software is not upgraded for several years
- Digital sovereignty implications: requirement for self-hosting or choosing where data is stored. This may impact the right and ability for a company to control their own digital data, including customer and employee data, software, hardware, and other digital intellectual property. Digital sovereignty requirements may require that data remains on-premise or is hosted by a specific service provider, or within a specific geographic region at all times, this may be due to legal conflicts perhaps between GDPR and U.S. state privacy laws, or the choice of the data owner for how and where they wish to protect their data
- Competitive pricing options: different providers of the software for support or hosting environments such as self-hosting or choosing optional hosting solutions.
- Online office suites are portable and users can edit their documents more easily where this can be done from any device with a web browser, with a connection to the network where the online office suite's services are hosted, without consideration of which operating system the local device is running, and the suite has adequate functionality
- If the user’s computer fails, the documents may still be safely stored on the remote server provided that the data files are also stored in the cloud and not locally
- Online service providers' backup processes and overall stability will generally be superior to that of most home systems
- Maintenance effort of devices should be much simpler where it is not necessary to also install and maintain an office suite on the local device
- Levels of support services vary significantly between vendors, this can affect costs significantly, support options may be a combination of searching yourself on the web, email support, telephone support, level 1 through to level 4 engineering support, or even 3rd party consultancy
- Scalabilty of the solution is important is the way that the more the company grows, the more project methodologies are likely to be implemented in different department. Therefore, evaluate the tool accordingly in order to avoid costly IT migration in the future.
- If the network between client devices and the online office suite services are too slow or unavailable, the online office suite may not work. Businesses may require a Service Level Agreements (SLA) for a required level of network high availability, all locations for all users need to be considered. Online office suites may allow the users to regularly backup data, In some cases they provide synchronization of copies of documents between the server and the local device
- Online office suite service availability, a proven level of high availability may be required, perhaps when used in a business environment. Local hosting could be more reliable
- Data backup considerations, such as how far back in time data is kept, how it can be searched for, how easily data can be recovered, how quickly it can be recovered.
- Control over the version of the software used: with some solutions the user has no control if the software is changed, the user is forced to use the changed version, even if the changed version is less suitable. Some online office suite systems enable users to host their own services and control the version of online office suite

== See also ==
- Comparison of office suites
- List of office suites
- Office suite
