= Vanilla Forums =

Internet forum software

Vanilla
- Original author: Mark O'Sullivan
- Developers: Vanilla Forums Inc. (originally), now part of Higher Logic
- Initial release: 1 July 2006
- Stable release: 3.3 / 29 October 2019; 6 years ago
- Written in: PHP
- Platform: PHP, MySQL
- Type: Forum software
- License: GNU GPL
- Website: www.higherlogic.com/vanilla/
- Repository: github.com/vanilla/vanilla

Vanilla Forums, also known as Higher Logic Vanilla, is an online community software platform. In May 2021, it was acquired by Higher Logic, a customer engagement company based in Arlington, Virginia.

Its open source product, Vanilla OSS, is a lightweight Internet forum package written in the PHP scripting language using the Garden framework. The software is released under the GNU GPL. Vanilla Forums is free software, standards-compliant, customizable discussion forums. Since 2009 there is also a cloud-hosted version (offered by Vanilla).

Vanilla's open source project was released on 1 July 2006, and has since undergone many changes, the most notable being the complete rewrite between Vanilla OSS and Vanilla Cloud, the latter of the two became the primary product and Vanilla 1 was passed into the hands of other developers. Vanilla 2, open source is still maintained and supported by the core team.

Vanilla is designed to bring forums back to their roots, providing core functionality with additional features such as emoticons available as plugins.

== Business model ==
Vanilla Cloud is funded in part by a custom, non-distributed hosted implementation of the software run as a commercial SaaS, by Vanilla Forums, Inc. offering various plans with support options.

Hosted plans offer many features from the open source version with additional premium add-ons supported by the core team.

Vanilla OSS is supported by the original core team with help by the community.

== Features ==
Vanilla OSS is a free, FOSS, extensible and multi-lingual forum system. The following items describe the open source version:

- Users can easily set up and maintain a full-featured discussion forum with unlimited categories
- A variety of community made themes and add-ons are available.
- Single sign-on
- Social media login
- Embeddable forums
- Import from other forums
- Commenting system for a site
- Integrates with other FOSS projects, like WordPress

== History ==
Mark O'Sullivan created an early version of Vanilla to support his own online graphic design and programming community. Between 2002 and 2005, this alpha version of the forum went through many revisions, and the core theming and plugin engines were built, culminating in the release of Vanilla OSS.

Vanilla increased in popularity and was invited to TechStars 2009 in Boulder. At the start of 2010 Vanilla received 500,000 CAD in series A funding. In July 2010, Vanilla Cloud was released, which was a complete rewrite of Vanilla OSS.

=== Acquisition by Higher Logic ===
In May 2021, Vanilla was acquired by Higher Logic, a customer engagement company based in Arlington, Virginia. The acquisition expanded Higher Logic’s capabilities in online communities and support forums. Since the acquisition, Vanilla has been integrated into the Higher Logic Vanilla product line.

=== Vanilla OSS ===
Vanilla OSS has a very lightweight core with a number of optional plugins, including chat, private messages, "Who's Online", and attachments.

The most recent version (2.6.3) was released on September 23, 2018.

Vanilla OSS is still maintained by the Vanilla team with help of the user community.

=== Vanilla Cloud ===
Vanilla Cloud is a complete rewrite of Vanilla using the Garden Framework, an MVC, object oriented, modular, extendable framework.

New core features in Vanilla Cloud:

- GPL importer for other forum systems such as vBulletin and phpBB.
- <embed> Vanilla (embed forum anywhere via JavaScript)
- Social Connect
- Vanilla Mobile - Configuration required
- Vanilla Connect (Single Sign In)
- Themes
- Banner
- File Upload - included as a plugin
- WYSIWYG Editor - included as a plugin
- Emoticons - included as a plugin

=== Garden ===
Garden is the PHP framework on which Vanilla Cloud is built, and deployed with, but can also be used as an MVC framework in its own right, and has a convention-based folder structure.

When downloading a Vanilla release, it is packaged in Garden as an application.

Garden can be developed on via 'Addons' of applications, plugins, themes, and locales.

Each application follows the MVC paradigm, and applications are typically placed in the applications folder, plugins in plugins folder, and so on.

Applications can be extended by plugins and themes, these mainly use a combination of convention based file structure, configuration, and event hooks.

Pluggability is a core feature of the framework, as is object-oriented programming, so the application and core is mainly extended via plugin classes using a public method naming convention to denote event hooks, 'magic event' hooks, 'magic methods', and occasionally method overrides. Some general functions in the core can be overridden by predefining them.

In addition, locales can be used to translate into different languages, or variations of text, which are replaced by reference.

== Release history ==
Legend:
Unsupported
Supported
Latest version
Preview version
Future version

Version	Release date	Notable changes	Latest release	
2.0	21 July 2010	Bug fixes	2.0.18.13	14 September 2014
2.1	29 April 2014	MeBox, improved social features, bug fixes, improved embedding of forums, support for WordPress plugins, and /me action	2.1.13p1	6 November 2015
2.2	12 November 2015	Improved features, better security and PHP 5.3 min requirement	2.2.1	7 May 2016
2.3	18 November 2016	Improved features, HTML emails, bug fixes, better security and PHP 5.4 min requirement	2.3.1	12 May 2017
2.4	31 January 2017	New caching system, updated dependencies, new responsive dashboard, PHP 5.6 min requirement, and a lot of changes	2.4b1	31 January 2017
2.8	15 March 2019	Rich editor, Keystone theme.	2.8.1	15 March 2019
3.0	June 2019	New Rich Editor features and PHP 7.1 min requirement.	3.0	June 2019
3.1	July 2019		3.1	July 2019
3.2	September 2019	React-based embed system	3.2	September 2019
3.3	October 2019	Rich Editor	3.3	October 2019
2021.009	7 May 2021	Release info	2021.009	7 May 2021

== Hosted forums ==
The hosted version of Vanilla runs on the newest version of Vanilla. It also provides features that are held back from the community edition (usually people who are self-hosting their forum). The features held back are Reactions & Badges, Polls, User Ranks, and enterprise integrations such as Salesforce, Zendesk, and GitHub (among others). This leads to ongoing discussions in Vanilla's own community forums. There have been numerous discussions in the past about the business model and why certain features have been held back. The community version of the software has seen developers replicate many of these functionalities.

== See also ==
- Comparison of Internet forum software
