= Invision Community =

Internet community software

- Developer: Invision Power Services
- Stable release: 4.7.19 / November 12, 2024; 16 months ago
- Platform: PHP / MySQL
- Type: Forum software
- License: Proprietary
- Website: invisioncommunity.com

Invision Community is a brand of forum software developed in 2002 and originally marketed as Invision Power Board. The current version of the software was written in PHP and uses MySQL for database storage.

Invision Power Services (IPS) was created in 2002 by Charles Warner and Matt Mecham after they left Jarvis Entertainment Group, which had bought the forum software Ikonboard from Mecham. Their first product sold by IPS was the forum software Invision Power Board, which quickly gathered a community of former Ikonboard users.

The software has been marketed for over twenty years and has been updated and changed over that timeframe.

== Version 1.x.x ==
Early releases of Invision Power Board were available as a download free of charge under a proprietary license.

== Version 2.x.x ==
In 2004 Invision Power Board ended its free releases for non-commercial uses.

After the 2.0.1 update, the free downloads were replaced with a free demo with restrictions of 5000 posts, 1000 threads, 200 members and other restrictions, thus ending its claims that Invision Power Board would be free forever thereby upsetting many users. In version 2.3, the product shipped with 2 skins, the classic light blue skin and a new default darker skin.

== Version 3.x.x ==
Version 3.0 was initially released on Tuesday, June 23, 2009.

== Version 4.x.x ==
In May 2012, Version 4.0 represented a ground-up rewrite of Invision Power Board and related offerings.

With the release of IP.Suite 4.0, IPS has decided to no longer honor the perpetual lifetime licenses they have sold earlier. As a compensation for legacy customers, they offered a free transition period to the standard license type before legacy customers would be required to pay their first renewal if they wanted to continue to receive support and future updates.

The first officially supported release was version 4.0.0 on 9 April 2015. IP.Suite 4 was not properly announced as released until 16 June, at which point it had already reached version 4.0.8.

== See also ==
- Comparison of Internet forum software
