= Simple Machines Forum =

Open-source, Internet forum program

- Developer: Simple Machines
- Stable release: 2.1.7 (March 8, 2026; 5 months ago) [±] 2.0.19 (December 21, 2021; 4 years ago) [±]
- Written in: PHP
- Type: Internet forum
- License: Open Source SMF 2: 3-clause BSD License SMF 1: Simple Machines License
- Website: www.simplemachines.org
- Repository: github.com/SimpleMachines/SMF

Simple Machines Forum (SMF) software is an open-source web application that provides Internet forum and message board services. It is developed by Simple Machines.

The name reflects the creator's initial goal of providing a website that could be operated by novice programmers and requires minimal server resources. Simple Machines won the forum-software.org best free forum software award in 2009.

== Organization ==
Simple Machines Forum is an open-source discussion board software project of volunteers participating in various operating functions including development, customization, documentation, localization/translation, user support, and marketing. The project is owned by a non-profit organization, named Simple Machines. Liroy van Hoewijk is president and CEO of the organization; Aleksi Kilpinen is the current project manager of SMF. "Sesquipedalian" is SMF's lead software developer.

Simple Machines is organized and operates as a not-for-profit membership corporation organized under the laws of the U.S. State of Nevada. To be eligible for membership, a person or entity must be nominated by a current member of the corporation and must complete a written or electronic membership application and approved by the board of directors. The organization has not applied to become a 501(c)(3) organization; however, its internal bylaws still prohibit activities which would disqualify it from becoming one in the future.

The organization is funded by private donations, advertisements on its website, and income from "charter memberships".

== History ==
On June 16, 2001, 16-year-old Zef Hemel along with collaborators Jeff Lewis, Corey Chapman, T. Oswalds, and Matt Mecham released the first open source bulletin board written in Perl called YaBB 1.0 (Yet Another Bulletin Board). YaBB 1.0 was the leading free forum software package at the time. It proved, however, to be inefficient and slow for active communities.

On November 12, 2001, shortly after the release of YaBB 1.0, a second program, YaBB SE 1, written by Jeff Lewis and Joseph Fung (from Lewis Media Inc.) with help from Zef Hemel and Christian Land (from the YaBB project) was released. Ultimately, users of this rough PHP port of YaBB also reported resource and security problems.

Lewis and Fung split off from the YaBB SE team to try a different approach for addressing the YaBB SE efficiency problems, security concerns, and to add new features. Lewis and Fung did a complete rewrite of the code and changed the brand name to Simple Machines Forum (SMF). On September 30, 2003, the first "YaBB SE/SMF" product, SMF 1.0 Beta 1a, was released.

The development and support team for YaBB SE was shut down in March 2004 with hundreds of communities in operation, when the developers joined the SMF project. A converter was developed to convert YaBB SE to SMF.

On October 23, 2006, the Simple Machines Forum project was split off from Lewis Media for the purpose of "[solidification of] the team’s commitment to continuously providing free software, without the perceived risks of corporate influence". The new company was named Simple Machines, LLC. Simple Machines LLC was registered in the state of Arizona, and the transfer of copyrights from Lewis Media to Simple Machines LLC was completed on 24 November 2006 during a three-day retreat in Tucson, AZ.

On Dec 02, 2006, SMF 1.1 was released.

On April 8, 2007, Simple Machines announced the introduction of SMF 2.0. SMF 2.0.x has been in development alongside SMF 1.1 since December 2005.

In June 2010, Simple Machines re-formed as a not-for-profit organization (NPO) registered in Nevada. The transfer of assets from LLC to NPO was completed in April 2011 and in May 2011, Simple Machines, LLC was dissolved. On the 24th of September 2010, the Simple Machines team announced the dissolving of the Simple Machines LLC and all assets moved to the nonprofit organization (Simple Machines) set up for the project.

On June 11, 2011, SMF 2.0 was released.

On February 9, 2022, SMF 2.1 was released.

== Licensing ==
SMF 1.0 and 1.1 are published under a proprietary license. While it is source-available, redistribution and/or distribution of modified components is limited to authorized entities.

SMF version 2.0 and 2.1 are licensed under the 3-clause BSD license. It is also open source with redistribution of modified code subject to the BSD requirements.

== Products ==
Simple Machines Forum (SMF) software is written in PHP and uses MySQL for database management.

SMF is commonly deployed on basic web hosting packages, usually Linux, Apache, MySQL, PHP (LAMP) compliant servers. Installations on VPS or dedicated servers are usually needed for sites with a large number of concurrent users online at the same time. The number of concurrent users that can be handled depends on the available server resources, the resource limits a hosting provider may imply, the server configuration, and on which kind of modifications have been installed. SMF itself has virtually no limit of traffic it can process, however: the more users online, the more powerful hardware it will require in order to function.

Simple Machines Forum has 4 versions, SMF 1.0, SMF 1.1, SMF 2.0 and SMF 2.1

| Version | Release Date | Latest Rev# | Revision Date | Development |
|---|---|---|---|---|
| SMF 1.0 | Sep 30, 2003 | 1.0.23 | Dec 16, 2012 | Inactive (Note: Replaced by SMF 1.1) |
| SMF 1.1 | Dec 3, 2006 | 1.1.21 | April 24, 2015 | Inactive (Note: Replaced by SMF 2.0) |
| SMF 2.0 | Jun 11, 2011 | 2.0.19 | Dec 21, 2021 | Active (Note: There are 33 improvements between 2.0 and 1.1) |
| SMF 2.1 | Feb 9, 2022 | 2.1.6 | Jun 26, 2025 | Active (Note: There are 54 improvements between 2.1 and 2.0) |

== Feature add-on modifications ==
SMF has a modification base repository for free modification hosting and tracking via the Simple Machines main site. Many modifications, or "mods" as they are usually called, have been created and distributed free of charge, including an arcade, Help desk, profile additions, gallery, spam filter, various SEO features, and many more. Before being listed on the SMF Mods site, the mod is validated by the SMF Team, to ensure that it complies with the SMF Coding Guidelines.

The Package Manager included in SMF is one of the flagship features. It allows an administrator to install modifications and updates to SMF without having to modify the code of the script, usually with only a few mouse clicks.

== Criticism ==
Even though the sources were available from the start, SMF has been criticized by the open source community for not being available under a free software license. Redistribution of earlier releases of the software, even unmodified, is not allowed without a written permission. The source code is not redistributable either, although it is allowed to distribute instructions on how to modify it.

Starting with the 2.0 release the software is available under the BSD license, resolving the concerns.

== See also ==
- Comparison of Internet forum software
- List of Internet forums
