= Ikonboard =

Internet forum software

- Original author: Matt Mecham
- Developer: Ikonboard
- Release: September 1999
- Stable release: 3.1.5a
- Written in: Perl, PHP
- Type: Discussion forum
- License: Proprietary
- Website: ikonboard.net

Ikonboard was a freeware online forum or Bulletin Board System developed in Perl, PHP for use on MySQL, PostgreSQL, Oracle, as well as flat file databases.

== Ikonboard History ==
=== Early years ===
Ikonboard was originally developed by Matt Mecham, with the first release being Ikonboard 0.9 beta in September 1999. Originally much of the development took place on ikondiscussion.com (no longer active) until it suffered a server crash in March 2001 and it was initially thought everything might have been lost, including early work on version 3. As a result, they switched to Ikonboard.com, and by April 2001 the majority had been recovered.

=== During ownership of Jarvis Entertainment Group (JEG) ===
In late April 2001 Ikonboard officially joined the Jarvis Network. At this point the latest available release was 2.1.8, with 3.0 in beta development. Matt Mecham sold Ikonboard to the Jarvis Entertainment Group for 50,000 shares of common stock in the publicly traded company, but said in a 2002 interview that he was unable to sell any of the shares. Soon after the release of 3.0 Mecham stopped developing Ikonboard, and departed to work on Invision Power Board. It is believed that Mecham had been paying for the domain during the time JEG owned Ikonboard. A year after his departure the DNS was altered to point to a holding page which redirected users to other software, during this time there was a legal dispute over the domain ownership.

After the departure of Matt Mecham, owner of JEG made a public request for individuals to staff and develop Ikonboard. As a result, a group of individuals emerged with separate development and support teams formed. Amongst the others to later emerge were Sly, Camil, Quasi and these along with the others were seen as the 'second set' of coders. On June 12, 2002 Ikonboard 3.1 was made with plans for PHP versions being announced at the same time. Initially the release represented small bug fixes to Mechams' 3.0.x series. In October 2003 chairman (and CEO) of JEG John Jarvis was forced out of JEG.

=== During ownership of Westlin Corporation ===
In February 2004 the company changed its name to Westlin Corporation. The departure of the second set of coders was fairly low profile, with many of them departing to work on their own project Infinite Core Technology.

In summer 2005 it emerged that former JEG chairman John Jarvis was taking legal action against Westlin, to regain ownership of Ikonboard amongst other things. During much of September that year the sites' server was down. Westlin declined to comment on the outage, prompting several staff members to quit. In October 2005, with Westlin still declining to talk to the support staff and developers, Ikonboard releases were no longer available for download.

=== During ownership post-Westlin Corporation ===
On October 28, 2005, after weeks of speculation, ownership of Ikonboard was officially transferred to John Jarvis. However the change of ownership resulted in the site being down until December, with a new parent company 'Pitboss Entertainment'. Though John Jarvis officially owned Ikonboard he had no visible presence on the site, with Joshua Johnson managing Ikonboard on his behalf. Soon after coming back online development on 3.1.3 resumed, being developed by a group of volunteers who referred to themselves as 'The Ikonboard Team' (and in addition provided support via the site's forums). Ikonboard 3.1.3 was publicly released on January 30, 2006, and 3.1.4 was subsequently released in February. On March 22, 2006, it was announced that the parent company Pitboss Entertainment no longer existed, and that all its assets (including Ikonboard) now came under 'Level 6 Studios', and subsequently related contact details were amended. Development was unaffected by the parent company changes, and 3.1.5 was publicly released on May 30, 2006. Additionally the Ikonboard team started development on '3.2' though their work was never publicly released under the Ikonboard name. On September 10, 2006 development on this release was discontinued as the Ikonboard team departed to work on IkonForums 1.0.0, their own independent project.

With most of the developers gone efforts began on recruiting new developers, and plans for forthcoming releases were announced. In January 2007 the domain record contacts were revised to those of John Jarvis. This change implied that John Jarvis was still the owner of at least the domain, which appeared to contradict announcements made by those managing the site. For most of June 2007 Ikonboard suffered downtime, with 'DNS issues' being cited as the cause. On January 8, 2008 the (former) official German support site 'ikonboard.de - Reloaded' completed its transition in converting to IkonForums, though still provided support for Ikonboard.

=== During ownership - Ikonboard Services Inc. ===
As of September 2009, ownership of the ikonboard name (and possibly the software itself) passed back to Joshua Johnson. In June 2010, Ikonboard 3.1.5A was released, containing bug fixes and minor updates. In May 2012 it was reported that Ikonboard PHP was making progress, and is now used as the support forum. However, as of January 2017 no new software releases have been made, and their website has ceased to exist. The WHOIS records suggest the domain is no longer owned by either Ikonboard Services Inc or Joshua Johnson.

== Version History ==
=== Ikonboard 0.9 ===
The first released version of Ikonboard was 0.9 beta, in September 1999. It was written by Matthew Mecham in Perl and stored all data in flat text files. Compared to present-day message board software, such as Mecham's own Invision Power Board, it contained only basic features.

=== Ikonboard 1.x ===
Releases in the 1.x series of Ikonboard built on the original 0.9 beta code. It was still authored entirely by Mecham, and stored data in text files.

=== Ikonboard 2.1.x ===
Ikonboard's 2.1.x series incorporated some of the ideas and developments from the 1.x series, but started with a new codebase.

It was with the 2.1.x series releases that Ikonboard really became popular on the web, perhaps due to its status as a free alternative to UBB. The 2.1.x releases of Ikonboard contained many of the features found in today's forum software.

As with previous releases, Ikonboard 2.1.x releases were written in Perl and used a flat file storage system. While the actual code for the software continued to be written exclusively by Mecham, other members from the "Ikonboard community" assisted in providing things like images and documentation.

=== Ikonboard 2.2 ===
Ikonboard 2.2 was an effort to continue improving the 2.x series after Mecham shifted his efforts to Ikonboard 3.0, and development occurred alongside that of Ikonboard 3.0. Most of the development, promotion, and support efforts were focused on the 3.0 series, however, and there has never been a stable release of Ikonboard 2.2. Since late December 2005 the download for the 2.2 development was removed from the site, and effectively discontinued as the team work on the 3.x series.

=== Ikonboard 3.0 ===
Ikonboard 3.0 represented a "total rewrite" for Ikonboard. The board was still coded entirely in Perl; however, Mecham adopted an object-oriented style of coding, and did away with flat files in favor of storage abstraction, allowing data storage in a relational database such as MySQL or Oracle.

After the release of Ikonboard 3.0, Mecham stopped developing Ikonboard. Further releases in the 3.0.x series represented small fixes and improvements on Mecham's 3.0.0 code.

=== Ikonboard 3.1 ===
As the new developers gained familiarity with the code, larger changes were made in the 3.1.x series releases. For a long time the stable version was 3.1.2a. Noticeable additions included the addition of a 'quick reply' box below topics.

The next release was due to be 3.2 and was originally started in 2003. However, for various reasons work of this version stalled, this resulting in the next release of Ikonboard becoming 3.1.3 and was developed mainly by 2 coders. With the change of ownership around August 2005 the two coders departed leaving development on 3.1.3 at beta 09 stage. When Ikonboard returned online work on 3.1.3 continued, and Ikonboard 3.1.3 was publicly released on January 30, 2006. It contained many new features as well as fixing bugs and a couple security issues. The most significant new additions in this release was Humain Readable Image (HRI) on registration which keeps malicious users from mass registering, and an update centre in the adminCP.

Within a few weeks 3.1.4 was released, this release fixed bugs found since the previous release. On 2 June 2006 another release was made, like the previous release 3.1.5 fixed bugs that had been found. June 2010 Ikonboard Released 3.1.5a with minor updates and bug releases.

=== Ikonboard 3.2 ===
Ikonboard 3.2 is yet to be publicly released, though already has a notable history. Originally development began in late April 2003, however work on this release stalled, and development made later became part of iB 3.1.3. Then development on this release was restarted on February 10, 2006 by 'The Ikonboard Team', however they departed on September 10, 2006 taking their work with them to IkonForums.

Since their departure Ikonboards' developer has said that he'll be working on a 3.2 release. The release is believed to be similar to the previous development, with additional features similar to those found on Netgimmicks.com and Swarf.net. In January 2008 it was announced via mass email that '3.2 would be released in February 2008', and a topic in the support forums also announced its forums would be upgraded on 14 February to this release. However to date no release has been made and the topic has been removed. It has also been noticed that users enquiring about the 3.2 release via the forums have had their posting rights removed and the threads have been removed within a few days.

== Related products ==
=== myIkonboard ===
myIkonboard is a separate product originally created by Ikonboards' parent company. While not directly connected to Ikonboard, it was originally powered by a Perl version of Ikonboard with a custom installer. In March 2006 it was announced by Ikonboards' new owners that myIkonboard would return, powered by the Ikonboard Perl software. In June 2007 the website became unavailable, initially due to the domain expiring, though this was renewed after a few days. From June 2007 to February 2010 myIkonboard has been unavailable, with the a 'server not found' error message appearing when attempting to connect to the site.

As of February 2010, myIkonboard is now back online, under control of ikonboard.

=== Ikonboard PHP (Project Mongoose) ===
In 2002 work on a PHP based version of Ikonboard was commissioned. This work was entitled "Project Mongoose" and was a complete re-write of Ikonboard in PHP. It was similar only in name and ownership. Once 'Project Mongoose' reached a release candidate stage the core functionality which included an advanced session-handler and template system, then owners (Jarvis Entertainment Group, Inc.) requested that the existing MyIkonboard service - which was based on the Perl-Based Ikonboard product and running on over a dozen Windows-based servers. Ikonboard PHP was adapted to a multi-user system that allowed thousands of individual forums to be created and hosted through a completely PHP-based service and a converter was created to automate the process of transferring forums that were hosted on the old Perl-based MyIkonboard service. There was never a public release of Ikonboard PHP because the developers left the company in February 2003.

=== Ikonboard PHP Lite ===
Ikonboard PHP Lite was a re-branded version of a forum that was purchased by John Jarvis (Then CEO of Jarvis Entertainment Group) through an eBay auction. The only involvement the Project Mongoose developers had with this product was building a rudimentary installer at the request of Jarvis Entertainment Group.)
