= Zonda Home =

American publishing company

- Industry: Publishing
- Genre: Commercial property Home construction
- Founded: 1976; 50 years ago
- Founder: Michael M. Wood; Michael J. Hanley
- Headquarters: Newport Beach, California, United States
- Owner: MidOcean Partners
- Website: zondahome.com

Zonda Home provides data and publications relating to commercial property and home construction in North America. The company's publications include Architect, the official magazine of the American Institute of Architects, Builder, the official magazine of the National Association of Builders (NAHB), Pool & Spa News, Journal of Light Construction, Affordable Housing Finance, and Multifamily Executive.

== History ==
The company was founded as Hanley Wood by Michael M. Wood and Michael J. Hanley in 1976. In August 2005, the company was sold to JPMorgan Partners (now CCMP Capital) and Wood resigned.

In January 2013, the company acquired Metrostudy.

In December 2018, the company was acquired by MidOcean Partners and merged with Meyers Research.

In April 2020, the company acquired Bird.i, a satellite imagery and artificial intelligence (AI) technology company in the UK, further evolving the brand into a leading research, data, and technology company. Bird.i was rebranded to Zonda Satellite in 2022, reflecting the complete adoption of Bird.i into the Zonda portfolio.

In October 2020, the company was rebranded as Zonda Home.

In April 2021, Zonda Home acquired Urban Analytics, a Canadian multi-family and urban data company. In the same month, the company acquired online home search platform BuzzBuzzHome, renaming it Livabl in April 2022.

In February 2024, the company announced its intention to acquire Builders Digital Experience and its new construction listing site, NewHomeSource.com. With this acquisition, Zonda becomes the largest provider of new construction home listings in North America.

In May 2026, it was announced that Zonda Home would be acquired by CoStar Group for $800 million. The acquisition includes the homebuilding industry's leading B2B information platform - used by builders, developers, and lenders - and brings NewHomeSource.com, the top online marketplace for new home construction, into CoStar Group's real estate portfolio. With the addition of NewHomeSource.com to its real estate family, CoStar Group states that they plan to “create richer digital experiences for builders and consumers and improve how new construction homes are marketed, visualized, and discovered online.”

In August 2026, the acquisition of Zonda Home by CoStar Group was approved and completed. The acquisition expands CoStar Group's presence across the residential real estate ecosystem, specifically extending the company's proprietary data, analytics, software, and marketplace capabilities into new home construction. The leading website for new home construction listings, NewHomeSource.com, is now a "sister site" for other popular real estate sites from CoStar Group, such as Homes.com and LoopNet.

== Real estate studies ==
The company produces intermittent reports on real estate markets that receive broad American media coverage. Fast Company covered a study on building lot availability, MSNBC covered one on which home remodeling projects bring the most value, and Boston.com covered another on the shrinking square footage of new houses.
