= Fox Broadcasting Co. v. Dish Network, LLC =

2015 American copyright case

- Court: C.D. Cal.
- Full case name: Fox Broadcasting Company, Inc.; Twentieth Century Fox Film Corporation; Fox Television Holdings, Inc. v. Dish Network L.L.C.; Dish Network Corporation
- Decided: January 12, 2015
- Citations: No. CV12-04529-DMG (SHx) (C.D. Cal. November 7, 2012),(C.D. Cal. January 12, 2015) and No. 12-57048 (9th Cir. July 24, 2013)

Case history
- Prior actions: In 2012, the District Court denied the preliminary injunction. Fox appealed the ruling to the United States Court of Appeals for the Ninth Circuit (Case No. CV12-04529-DMG (SHx)) The 9th Circuit affirmed. The plaintiff filed a petition for rehearing and rehearing en banc, the rehearing was denied. In January 2015, the District court granted in part summary judgment.
- Subsequent action: The summary judgment was denied in relationship with some of the alleged contractual infringements

Court membership
- Judge sitting: Dolly M. Gee

Case opinions
- The district court granted partial summary judgment concluding that there were nor direct neither secondary copyright infringement of Fox's Copyrights by Dish, but there were contractual infringements.

Keywords
- Copyright; Public performance; Direct infringement; Volitional conduct; Secondary infringement; Fair use; Commercial skipping; Broadcasting; Video on Demand; Summary judgment

Fox Broadcasting Co. v. Dish Network, LLC (C.D. Cal. January 12, 2015) is a copyright case in which the United States District Court for the Central District of California, by granting partial summary judgment, denied most parts of the copyright claims presented by Fox Broadcasting Company (Fox) against Dish Network (Dish) for its service, a DVR-like device that allowed users to record programming that could be accessed later through any Internet-connected device (Dish Anywhere). The service offered by Dish also allowed users to record any or all Fox's (and the four major broadcast networks) prime-time programs (Prime Time Any Time or PTAT) and to automatically skips commercials (AutoHop).

Fox argued that Dish Network was guilty of copyright infringement and breach of contract. The district court held that Dish Anywhere did not infringe Fox's public performance right because the service only could be used by subscribers to get access to their own recordings. The recording action and the later transmission depended on the subscribers' engagement in a volitional action. Therefore, there was no direct infringement from Dish. Neither was there a secondary infringement of the company because Dish's users did not publicly perform by using Dish Anywhere.

Dish had a license from Fox that allowed it to transmit Fox's programing to its subscribers. When a user transmits programing from one device to another, he or she accesses something that is already in his or her possession from a different device, and this action is not a public performance within the meaning of the statute. The court held that PTAT did not directly infringe Fox's reproduction right because Dish did not engage in a volitional conduct. The recording was made in exclusive response to the user's command. Also, the court ruled that PTAT used by Dish's subscribers was fair use according Sony case.

Most, but not all, of Fox's claims were dismissed; ultimately an agreement was reached whereby AutoHop would only become available for Fox stations seven days after a program is transmitted; terms of the settlement were not disclosed.

== Background ==
According to the courts' previous holdings, and the summary judgment decision the factual background was as follows:

=== Procedural background ===
On May 24, 2012, Fox sued Dish for copyright infringement and breach of contract. On August 22, 2012, Fox filled a motion for a preliminary injunction to enjoin Dish from operating, distributing, selling, or offering Dish Anywhere, PTAT, AutoHop and any comparable features. On November 7, 2012, the district court denied the motion. Fox appealed the ruling to the 9th Circuit. On July 25, 2013, 9th Circuit affirmed. Fox's petition for rehearing and rehearing en banc was denied. On January 12, 2015, the District court granted partial summary judgment.

=== Challenged products and features ===
==== Hopper ====
In 2012, Dish started offering a Set-top box (STB) with digital video recorder (DVR) feature and video on demand (VOD) feature called the Hopper.

==== Dish Anywhere (Hopper with Sling) ====
In January 2013, Dish implemented the next generation Hopper, Hopper with Sling, that allows consumers to view television content from their home STBs over the Internet by use of a device that communicates with any Internet connected device. This technology allows the user watch television on their laptops, tablets or smartphones via a remote access to the recorded programing. To access to this service the subscribers must log into the company page or download an application for their tablet or smartphone. The service only is available to subscribers in good-standing.

==== PrimeTime Anytime (PTAT) ====
PrimeTime Anytime (PTAT) is the Dish service, available since March 15, 2012, that allows subscribers to automatically record all prime time programs from the four major broadcasting networks (ABC, CBS, NBC, and Fox). Users can determine whether or not to activate the PTAT functions, but the start time and the end time of the recordings and the programming schedules of the day are determined by Dish. All recordings are done on the user's Hopper. PTAT recordings are automatically deleted after several days (the default setting was 8 days).

==== AutoHop ====
In May 2012, Dish launched a new feature of hopper, called AutoHop, which enabled a user who recorded prime time programs with PTAT to automatically skip all commercials included in those programs. The user could opt to enable the AutoHop feature which would automatically skip all commercials. Dish transmitted the marking data, data that told the Hopper when the commercials began and ended, to PTAT users every day. The data were manually generated and examined by Dish's employees in order to assure its accuracy and quality; to do this Dish copied Fox's programs (QA copies) and used them internally. Regardless of AutoHop function, the Hopper retained all commercials until the TV program would be deleted when its retention period had expired. The AutoHop function offered users the ability to manually rewind or fast-forward the recordings that included the commercials.

==== Hopper Transfers ====
Hopper Transfers allows DISH subscribers to transfer copies of recordings from a DVR to a tablet or smartphone for later viewing at any location with or without an Internet connection. Copies will not play if the device has not contacted the DISH Anywhere site for 30 days.

=== Contracts ===
Fox claimed Dish breached three clauses of their contract; the first two clauses were in the Retransmission Consent (RTC) Agreement of 2002, and the last clause was in the Letter Agreement about VOD in 2010.

- EchoStar [now Dish] shall not, for pay or otherwise, record, copy, duplicate and/or authorize the recording, copying, duplication (other than by consumers for private home use) or retransmission of any portion of any Station's Analog Signal without prior written permission of the Station, except as is specifically permitted by this Agreement (No copying provision).
- EchoStar acknowledges and agrees that it shall have no right to distribute all or any portion of the programming contained in any Analog Signal on an interactive, time-delayed, video-on-demand or similar basis; provided that Fox acknowledges that the foregoing shall not restrict EchoStar's practice of connecting its Subscribers' video replay equipment ... (No-Distribution provision).
- DISH will disable fast forward functionality during all advertisements; FBC and DISH may include a pre-roll announcement prior to each show regarding the fast-forward disabling. DISH and FBC will discuss in good faith the timing of DISH's implementation of such fast-forward disabling and messaging to consumers; provided that DISH acknowledges and agrees that such fast-forward disabling is a necessary condition to distribution of the Fox broadcast content via VOD. Dish did not offer Fox's programs via its VOD service.

== Judicial opinions ==
The first district court opinion denied Fox's preliminary injunction. The Ninth Circuit reviewed the district court's decision with a very deferential standard of review, and affirmed. The second district court decision granted to Dish partial summary judgment.

=== District Court for the Central District of California denied preliminary injunction ===
On November 7, 2012, the district court denied Fox's motion for preliminary injunction finding that 1) PTAT and AutoHop neither infringed on the copyright nor committed breach of contract; and 2) although QA copies constituted copyright infringement and breach of contract, the harm from the copies was not irreparable. For further discussion and details see the district court opinion.

==== Copyright infringement ====
Regarding the copies on the Hopper, Fox argued that Dish directly infringed on the copyright holders exclusive right to reproduction because Dish had an impermissible degree of control over the copying process of PTAT. The Court found that while Dish was substantially involved in the copying process on the users' PTAT, the involvement was not different from precedent non-infringement cases of Cartoon Network, LP v. CSC Holdings, Inc. and CoStar v. LoopNet, in which prior courts judged that the individual users, and not the service providers were liable for infringing copies. The Court concluded that the person who copied Fox's program on the user's PTAT was the user who initiated the command and not Dish.

The defendant, Dish, argued that the QA copies constituted fair use of 17 U.S.C. § 107. Referring to Sega v. Accolade, Dish argued that the copies were fair use because they were ultimately used for the user's fair use purpose (In Sega, the Ninth Circuit had judged that copying code for reverse engineering purpose was "intermediate copying," and protected by fair use.). The Court denied Dish's argument because the purpose and the effects on the economy of QA copies were fundamentally different from those of reverse engineering. The Court examined the four factors of fair use as follows:

1. Purpose and Character of the Use: the commercial purpose and non-transformative uses of the QA copies weighs against a finding of fair use.
2. Nature of the Copyrighted Work: the creative nature of the Fox's copyrighted works weighted against a finding of fair use.
3. Amount and Substantiality of Use: while the QA copies were used for the limited purpose of ensuring that the marking data is correct and were not distributed to the users, Dish entirely duplicated the Fox's programs. So, this factor weighted against a finding of fair use (but considerably less than the other three factors).
4. Effect of the Use on the Market: Fox licensed copies of its programs to other companies (e.g. Hulu, Netflix, iTunes, and Amazon) to offer its works to subscriber of those companies. The Court discussed that Dish offered AutoHop to its users in order to compete with those companies without providing payment for the license; the Court held that in doing so Dish harmed Fox's opportunity to negotiate with Dish or Fox's ability to enter into a similar licensing agreement with others in the future by making the copies less valuable.

In consideration of these factors, the Court concluded that QA copies did not constitute fair use and the Court found that Fox was likely to succeed on the merits of this infringement claim. However, the Court also found that Fox failed to demonstrate the irreparable harm necessary to garner the preliminary injunction. The Court noted that the amount of money for licensing to other companies would show that the harm resulted from the QA copies was also compensable.

Additionally, Fox alleged that Dish infringed Fox's distribution right through use of PTAT copies and AutoHop. However, mentioning that all copying were conducted on the user's PTAT without "change hands" and that the only thing distributed from Dish to the users was the marking data, the Court denied Fox's claim. Citing Sony Corp. of America v. Universal City Studios, Inc., the Court concluded that the users' copying at home for the time shift purpose did not infringe Fox's copyright. Then, Dish's secondary liability was also denied.

==== Breach of contract ====
Fox asserted that QA copies and PTAT violated the RTC Agreement. The Court, as similar to their copyright infringement analysis, reasoned that while QA copies breached the contract, PTAT did not constitute the breach of the contract.

Next, Fox stated that PTAT was a VOD offering and breached the 2010 letter agreement. Dish maintained that AutoHop did not breach the contract for two reasons: 1) PTAT was not VOD but DVR; and 2) the VOD provision was an unenforceable option for Dish because of technological and logistical limitations. The Court concluded that Dish did not breach contracts because PTAT was not a VOD, but more akin to DVR since: 1) Dish hasn't decided what programs are available in the PTAT "library;" 2) the user would not be able to watch the program if he/she had not turned on the function in advance of the program aired on; and 3) Fox's programs were not transmitted from a remote library, but stored and played on the users' Hopper.

=== United States Court of Appeals for the Ninth Circuit affirmed District Court decision ===
On July 24, 2013, the 9th Circuit affirmed the district court decision to dismiss Fox's motion for preliminary injunction.

==== Copyright infringement ====
The 9th Circuit held that:

- "[T]he district court did not abuse its discretion in holding that the broadcaster failed to demonstrate a likelihood of success on its copyright infringement and breach of contract claims regarding the television provider's implementation of the commercial-skipping products. As to a direct copyright infringement claim, the record did not establish that the provider, rather than its customers, made copies of television programs for viewing. The broadcaster did not establish a likelihood of success on its claim of secondary infringement because, although it established a prima facie case of direct infringement by customers, the television provider showed that it was likely to succeed on its affirmative defense that the customers' copying was a 'fair use'."

In addition, the Court mentioned that Fox did not own the copyrights to ads, and ads were not deleted from PTAT; the Court further noted that while Fox alleged the market harm resulted from the ad-skipping function, any analysis of the market harm should exclude consideration of AutoHop because ad-skipping did not implicate Fox's copyright interests.

==== Breach of contract ====
The Court supported the district court's decision to reject preliminary injunction on the alleged contract breaches as well. The district court interpreted "distribute" in the contract clauses to be analogous to the same word in the Copyright Act (17 U.S.C. § 106(3)), and constructed its analysis about copying on PTAT. Fox challenged this interpretation and construction, arguing that "distribute" meant "make available programs to users". At this point, the Court held that while Fox's interpretation was as plausible as the district court's, the parties had not argued about the meaning of "distribute" at a prior discussion, and any ambiguous terms in the contract should be interpreted by looking to the Copyright Act. The Court then affirmed the district court's construction. Further, Fox stated that PTAT was "similar" to "interactive, time-delayed, [or] video-on-demand" services that were prohibited under the contract. Dish argued its service was not identical to time-delayed or VOD, but could not show why it was not similar. The Court, however, held that the district court correctly found PTAT more akin to DVR than VOD.

=== District Court for the Central District of California granting partial summary judgment ===
On August 22, 2014, Fox moved for partial summary judgment on its claims. On January 12, 2015, the district court was granted in part. This decision came after Supreme Court decision in American Broadcasting Cos. v. Aereo, Inc., but the district court ruled that Aereo did not overrule the volitional conduct doctrine to hold primary infringement of copyright. The district court expressed that "the volitional conduct doctrine is a significant and long-standing rule, adopted by all Courts of Appeal to have considered it, and it would be folly to presume that Aereo categorically jettisoned it by implication." The district court pointed out to the Supreme Court expressions that specifically cautioned that that was a "limited holding" and should not be construed to discourage or to control the emergence or use of different kinds of technology. The district court read Supreme Court's Aereo decision in a way that allows to distinguish between an Aereo kind of activity and other activities in which a company merely supplies equipment, like Dish case.

==== Copyright infringement ====
Fox contended that through Dish Anywhere the company has publicly performed Fox's copyrighted programming by streaming over the Internet. The district court held that Dish Anywhere does not infringe Fox's public performance right because the service can only be used by subscribers to get access to their own recordings. The recording and the later transmission depend on the subscribers to engage in a volitional action. Therefore, there is no direct infringement from Dish. Neither there is a secondary infringement of the company because Dish's users do not publicly perform by using Dish Anywhere. Dish has license from Fox that allow it to transmit Fox's programing to its subscribers. When a user transmits programing from one device to another, she access in a different device to a something that already is in her possession, this action is not a public performance within the meaning of the statue. The court ruled that PTAT and Hopper Transfers do not directly infringe Fox's reproduction right because Dish does not engage in a volitional conduct. The recording is made in exclusive response to the user's command. While Dish sets some parameters of the PTAT service, the service operates automatically upon user request. The setting of the parameters is not enough to consider that Dish engage in a volitional conduct. In the case of Hopper Transfers, Dish has even less control. Neither the court found distribution right infringement by the act to make available the programing, because there is not actual dissemination of the programing (the copy does not change of hands). Finally, the court rejected Dish's secondary liability and held that PTAT and Hopper Transfers use by Dish's subscribers is fair use according Sony. The district court referred to its prior decision and deemed again as too speculative the potential market harm alleged by Fox for the use of PTAT. Fox contended that AutoHop infringes on its reproduction right by skipping Fox's own commercials. The district court held that AutoHop neither copies nor distributes anything, it just skips ads and therefore does not infringe Fox's copyright. Fox contended that QA copies infringe its reproduction right. Following its preliminary injunction decision analysis, the district court agreed with Fox. The district court pointed out that Fox would negotiate a licensing agreement or royalty payment for the right to copy Fox programming in any manner. Dish QA copies would impair Fox's ability to monetize that use. Therefore, Dish was held liable for direct copyright infringement for the reproduction of the QA copies.

==== Breach of contract ====
Fox contended that Dish distributed Fox's programing over the Internet in breach of contractual provisions. The District Court concluded that Dish's users retransmits Fox's programing within the contractual authorization provided by Fox. Nothing in the parties' agreement expressly limits retransmission to the context of a DBS-based multicast. Dish does not distribute Fox's programing; it is the user who transmits the programing to herself or other members of her household, which does not fulfill the meaning of distribution in the statue. However, the district court held that Dish Anywhere and Hopper Transfers breach the No Copying provision of the parties' agreement because Dish's subscribers can place-shift outside their homes. Fox did not give Dish its consent to offer this service to subscribers for use outside home. Fair Use is an affirmative defense to copyright infringement, but parties are free to bargain away their rights to make fair use of copyrighted material under contractual agreements. The district court denied the summary judgment in this point because considered that there was a triable issue of fact as to the damages flowing from the breach. Fox also contended that PTAT infringes the Non-Distribution Provision. The district court held that Dish did not distribute anything, because PTAT automatically recorded already permissible content to a subscriber and does not disseminate those recordings beyond user's home. Fox contended that the QA copies breached the No-Copying Provision. The district court agreed with Fox considering that there is a breach of contract remedy to solve the dispute. The reasonable amount of royalties that Dish should pay for the period that used QA copies is a triable issue of fact.

== Impact and reactions to the decision ==
=== After the 9th Circuit decision ===
The following comments were made: James Grimmelmann, a professor at the University of Maryland Law School, commented that the court would not count ad-skipping for purposes of copyright law, and predicted that it would impact on ad-supported content business. Annette Hurst, an attorney for Dish said that the decision unequivocally showed that advertisements were a financing mechanism, but they were not part of the copyrighted work. Additionally, Corynne McSherry, an attorney of the Electric Frontier Foundation, which had noted an amicus brief to the Ninth Circuit, made a statement that the holding was "a victory for fair use and consumer choice," and ensures that "technology makers can develop and offer new tools and services without fear of crippling liability where those tools and services are capable of substantial non-infringing uses." However, David Singer, an attorney for Fox, and other legal professionals pointed out that the result might be changed in succeeding trials because the Ninth Circuit applied a "deferential standard of review" to the request for a preliminary injunction, which required the plaintiff a very high bar to be granted.

=== After the district court partial summary judgment decision ===
Fox spokesman Scott Grogin said the company welcomed Gee's contract rulings, and was disappointed by her copyright findings. "This case is not, and has never been, about consumer rights or new technology," Grogin said. "It's always been about protecting creative works from being exploited without permission." In a statement, Dish said it welcomed the ruling. "Consumers are the winners today, as the court sided with them on the key copyright issues in this case," the company said.

Mitchell Zimmerman, Intellectual Property Counsel at Fenwick West LLP expressed that "[t]he ruling included mostly wins, but some losses, for DISH with implications for other online services that enable time- and space-shifting by end-users." He referred to the relationship of this decision with Aereo, he explains that Areo decision "caused controversy over whether the Supreme Court had sub silentio overturned a long line of cases holding it is not direct copyright infringement to provide an automated technology that consumers use to engage in arguably infringing acts, when the provider does not engage in the volitional conduct causing the infringement. " He explains that this was the first case after Aereo where the volition doctrine is analyzed and the court widely accepted it, limiting Aereo to "cable-like" contexts, and distinguishing the DISH technology from Aereo's.

CBS Corp and Walt Disney Co's ABC had settled similar litigation last year, as part of broader settlements allowing Dish to broadcast the networks' programs. Similar litigation against Dish by Comcast Corp's NBCUniversal had been put on hold pending developments in the Fox case.

Fox had been scheduled to go to trial against Dish on Feb. 24, but the case has been put on hold until Oct. 1. . Following the court's initial release of an unredacted copy of its opinion, the parties agreed to stay the case while they attempt to negotiate a settlement."

In Mitchell Zimmerman opinion, given the possibility of settlement, an appeal is unlikely in the case. Because of that, this decision "may be the final word in its assessment of these technologies, and may assume significant precedential authority".

The New York State Bar Association's Entertainment, Arts and Sports Law Blog, points out that this decision imply "that companies like DISH can innovate in ways that do not violate the Copyright Act. Those companies, however, must make sure that their own contracts do not prohibit them from making such advancements." In the same line, Akerman's Marks, Works & Secrets blog advises that "Firms seeking to rely on DISH therefore may not only need to be cognizant of the physical design of their products and services, but also may need to ensure that their licenses for copyrighted content are carefully drafted."

== See also ==
- Preliminary injunction
- Summary Judgment
- Criticism of Dish Network
