= LoopNet =

American commercial real estate marketplace website

LoopNet, Inc.
- Type: Subsidiary
- Traded as: Nasdaq: LOOP (2006-2012)
- Industry: Technology
- Founded: 1995; 31 years ago
- Founder: Dennis DeAndre
- Headquarters: 1331 L St NW, Washington, DC, United States
- Key people: Andrew Florence (CEO)
- Products: Listing plans; Media packages; Search tools
- Number of employees: 100
- Parent: CoStar Group
- Website: www.loopnet.com

LoopNet is an online marketplace for commercial property, providing property listings and marketing solutions for property owners. Founded in 1995 by Dennis DeAndre in San Francisco, the company initially focused exclusively on providing an internet platform for commercial property listings but has since expanded to offer a comprehensive suite of digital solutions for the commercial real estate industry. As of 2025, LoopNet is considered the leading commercial real estate digital marketplace, with more than 12 million unique monthly visitors. Today, LoopNet operates as a subsidiary of CoStar Group, which acquired the company in 2012 for approximately $860 million. The company is currently led by CEO Andrew Florence.

The company has multiple subsidiary services, including BizBuySell for business listings, Ten-X, the technology behind the online auctions, CityFeet for urban commercial space, and Showcase for commercial properties. LoopNet also offers LoopLink, a professional property search technology that can be integrated directly into commercial real estate brokers', owners', and Economic Development Corporations' websites, allowing them to manage listings in one centralized location while simultaneously updating their information across CoStar, LoopNet, and their own websites.

== History ==
LoopNet was founded in 1995 by Dennis DeAndre. Working alongside engineer Steve Midgley, the two built LoopNet into the internet's largest commercial real estate listing service. LoopNet underwent three rounds of private venture capital financing in 1997 (Indo Suez), 1998 (Trinity Capital & Partners) and $20 million in 1999 from fourT5 real estate brokers.

LoopNet was an early venture in Internet-based user-created content. As early as October 1996 virtually all of its commercial property listings were being entered by its users directly. Over time, LoopNet added the capability to import listings in an automated manner.

In 2001, the company merged with PropertyFirst.com.

In June 2006, the company became a public company via an initial public offering. At that time, the company had 360,000 commercial properties for sale or lease.

LoopNet acquired BizBuySell (2004), CityFeet (2007), REApps (2008), Land & Farm/Lands of America (2008) and Bizquest (2010).

In April 2012, CoStar Group acquired LoopNet for approximately $860 million in cash and stock.

In 2014, the company settled a trademark infringement lawsuit that it brought against Dotloop.

In 2020, to address rapid changes occurring in the COVID-19 commercial real estate market, the company added significant virtual tour capabilities.

In 2022, LoopNet expanded its international presence by launching LoopNet.co.uk, migrating the UK commercial property portal Realla.co.uk into the LoopNet brand. This move established a dedicated platform for the UK market. In 2025, the company further extended its reach into Europe with the launch of LoopNet.es and LoopNet.fr, targeting the Spanish and French commercial real estate sector.

== Business ==
LoopNet connects tenants and buyers with owners over an open and free network. As of April 2023, LoopNet had more than 12 million unique monthly visitors.

LoopNet's business model involves selling memberships to its site to those that lease or sell Commercial Real Estate. Paid or Premium Membership confers additional benefits with a free model existing but only showing those listings to groups with CoStar membership.

== Products and services ==
LoopNet provides a suite of digital solutions for commercial real estate professionals, organized around three core functions: property discovery, marketing and advertising, and integrated listing technologies.

== International Expansion ==
While LoopNet originally operated solely through its U.S.-based platform, the company began expanding internationally in 2022. These regional expansions aim to localize the user experience and concentrate listing inventory by geography, while still supporting global access through LoopNet.com. Each country-specific domain focuses primarily on commercial property listings within its respective market.

- LoopNet.ca launched in February 2022, targeting the Canadian commercial real estate sector.
- LoopNet.co.uk went live in November 2022, offering listings and services tailored to the United Kingdom.
- LoopNet.es was introduced in April 2025 to serve the Spanish market.
- LoopNet.fr followed in March 2025, focusing on commercial property in France.

LoopNet.com continues to host global listings and is accessible worldwide, but localized platforms provide region-specific marketing solutions, regulatory alignment, and curated inventory to better serve local markets.

=== Property Listing Marketplace ===
At its core, LoopNet operates a commercial real estate listing platform used by brokers, property owners, investors, and tenants. The marketplace covers a wide range of property types, including:

- Office
- Industrial
- Retail
- Restaurant
- Shopping Centers
- Multifamily
- Healthcare
- Hospitality
- Sports & Entertainment
- Land
- Specialty use
- Residential Income

Listings placed on LoopNet can be syndicated across affiliated CoStar Group platforms such as CoStar, CityFeet, and Showcase, expanding reach and exposure to broader buyer and tenant audiences.

== Legal issues ==
In CoStar Group, Inc. v. LoopNet, Inc. (2006), in which Loopnet prevailed, it was determined that Loopnet, as an operator of a website, was no different from Netcom, then an internet service provider, and was not responsible for copyright infringements by its users. This ruling established precedent for copyright liability protection for many websites. It followed the Religious Technology Center v. Netcom case (better known as Scientology vs. the Internet). LoopNet demonstrated that it policed any user violations after the fact. The court did not require the company to stop future violations before they occur. Such a ruling could have effectively shut down LoopNet's website as well as those of many application service providers. CoStar unsuccessfully argued that LoopNet was an active party to the violations and thereby guilty of copyright infringement.
