= Domain Group =

Australian digital real estate information company

Domain Holdings Australia Ltd
- Trade name: Domain Group
- Type: Subsidiary
- Industry: Real estate
- Founded: 1999
- Headquarters: 100 Harris Street, Pyrmont, Australia
- Key people: Jason Pellegrino (CEO)
- Brands: domain.com.au; commercialrealestate.com.au; allhomes.com.au; pricefinder.com.au
- Revenue: ▲ A$289.6 million (2021)
- Number of employees: 900+
- Parent: CoStar Group
- Website: domain.com.au

Domain Holdings Australia Ltd (or simply Domain Group) is an Australian digital property portal and associated real-estate industry business. It is best known for its real-estate website domain.com.au, and also owns the brands commercialrealestate.com.au and allhomes.com.au.

== History ==
It was founded by Fairfax Media, when the publisher branded their real-estate sections in print with the Domain brand and first established an online presence in 1999. Until Domain was listed as a public company on the Australian Securities Exchange, it was its wholly owned subsidiary for eighteen years.

In February 2015, the Australian Financial Review published an article highlighting Credit Suisse analyst expectations of a likely float of the Domain in the future, and attributed an AUD $1.3 billion valuation to the group.

On 21 February 2017, trading in Fairfax shares was suspended until half yearly results and an announcement of intent to turn Domain into a listed entity were announced. Domain Group was widely seen to "prop up" Fairfax revenues, as the company's publishing divisions were struggling.

Domain Group began trading on the Australian Securities Exchange on 16 November 2017. Having acquired a 20% shareholding in the firm, CoStar Group launched a takeover offer in February 2025.

In May 2025, CoStar Group entered an agreement to acquire 100% of the firm for A$3 billion. On August 27, CoStar announced that it had completed the purchase of the Australian company.

== Portfolio ==
The Domain Group is best known for its real-estate portal domain.com.au, which is Australia's second largest real-estate marketing business, with 90% market penetration. It competes directly with market leader REA Group, running realestate.com.au, which is majority-owned by News Corp Australia.

As of August 2023, the Domain Group consists of a portfolio of businesses including but not limited to:

- The Domain (domain.com.au) and Allhomes (allhomes.com.au) residential property listings portals
- The Commercial Real Estate commercial property portal (commercialrealestate.com.au)
- Domain Media media agency (domainmedia.com.au)
- Domain Review, Domain and Domain Prestige magazines
- Pricefinder, a property data business whose products focus on modelling projected values of real estate for investors, agents and financial institutions
- RealTime Agent point of sale platform
- Homepass estate agent CRM

== Cricket sponsorship ==
In June 2018, Domain Group were announced as platinum partner of the Australian men's cricket team. Under the deal, Domain became the presenting partner of men's test cricket over four years, which included the Ashes, and became the official real estate partner of Cricket Australia.
