= Matterport =

American 3D spatial mapping company

Matterport LLC
- Formerly: Matterport, Inc. (2011–2025)
- Type: Subsidiary
- Traded as: Nasdaq: MTTR (2021-2025)
- ISIN: US5770961002
- Industry: Computer vision; Real estate
- Founded: 2011; 15 years ago
- Founders: Matthew Bell; David Gausebeck; Mike Beebe
- Headquarters: Sunnyvale, California, United States
- Number of locations: 6 offices
- Area served: Worldwide
- Key people: R.J. Pittman (CEO); James D. Fay (CFO); David Gausebeck (CSO)
- Revenue: ▲US$170 million (2024); US$158 million (2023)
- Operating income: ▲US$83 million (2024); US$70 million (2023)
- Net income: ▼ −US$257 million (2024); −US$199 million (2023)
- Total assets: ▼US$544 million (2024); US$577 million (2023)
- Total equity: ▼US$397 million (2024); US$529 million (2023)
- Number of employees: ▲455 (2024); 438 (2023)
- Parent: CoStar Group
- Website: matterport.com

Matterport LLC is an American 3D spatial mapping company headquartered in Sunnyvale, California. It is a subsidiary of CoStar Group. The company was founded in 2011 as a private startup and subsequently merged with a special-purpose acquisition company in 2021 to commence public trading on the Nasdaq before being acquired by CoStar in 2025. The current CEO is R.J. Pittman.

Matterport produces cameras used to capture images for 3D mapping of indoor spaces and the creation of digital twins. The company also provides various software as a service for real estate and property management.

== History ==
=== 2011–2013: Founding as a startup ===
Matterport was founded as a private startup in 2011 by Matthew Bell, David Gausebeck (known for Gausebeck–Levchin test used in CAPTCHA technology) and Michael Beebe. The company was established after Bell and Gausebeck developed a prototype camera for capturing 3D images inside a room using the PrimeSense camera-on-a-chip, and later recruited Beebe for his expertise in 3D modeling and medical device design. In early 2012, the company joined the startup accelerator Y Combinator to incubate their project.

In April 2012, Matterport claimed that its prototype camera could scan 3D objects "20 times faster" and "18 times cheaper" than their competitors, and initiated collaborations with real estate and video game developers. In that year, the company secured US$1.6 million in seed funding. Subsequently, by March 2013, Matterport raised another US$4 million from 39 investors to initiate a Series A round of financing.

In July 2013, Matterport announced plans to release its first camera to the public. In November 2013, Bill Brown became the CEO of the company.

=== 2014–2018: Early growth ===
Matterport launched their first camera named 'Pro 3D' on March 13, 2014. In June 2014, Matterport competed against 14 other early-stage real estate startups in Realogy's FWD Innovation Summit, a real estate technology competition, and emerged as the winner. Subsequently, the company raised US$16 million in a Series B funding round, in part to bring its 3D mapping technology to mobile devices.

In June 2015, Matterport raised US$30 million in a Series C funding round with the goal of diversifying from its camera products and enhancing its software for stitching images together in virtual reality. The company began scaling operations and shifted its focus to the consumer by accelerating the development of content-capturing capabilities on mobile devices and expanding its developer platform across its web and mobile apps.

On December 3, 2018, Matterport appointed R.J. Pittman, who was previously the Chief Product Officer at eBay, as its CEO. Bill Brown, the former CEO, remained on the company board as an advisor.

=== 2019–2021: COVID-19 pandemic and SPAC merger ===
In April 2020, due to the COVID-19 pandemic, Matterport laid off 90 of its employees or roughly one-third of its workforce.

On February 8, 2021, Matterport announced its intention to go public by merging with Gores Holdings VI, a special-purpose acquisition company (SPAC), in a US$2.9 billion deal. The merger and deal were completed on July 23, 2021, and Matterport began publicly trading on the Nasdaq as MTTR.

Around the same time in July 2021, Bill Brown, the former CEO, sued Matterport over a bylaw regarding the SPAC merger acquisition that prevented him from trading shares of the new company following the merger. The court later ruled in favor of Brown on January 10, 2022.

=== 2022–onwards: Post-merger and acquisition by CoStar ===
On January 5, 2022, Matterport completed the acquisition of Enview, a company that specializes in artificial intelligence for 3D spatial data, for a total of US$37 million. Subsequently, in July 2022, Matterport acquired VHT Studios, a real estate marketing agency, for an undisclosed amount.

In July 2023, Matterport announced a restructuring of the company, which resulted in the layoff of 170 employees (equivalent to 30% of its workforce) as a cost-cutting measure.

In September 2023, Matterport was sued by investors for "allegedly allowing self-dealing by insiders".

On April 22, 2024, it was announced that Matterport would be acquired by the CoStar Group for a cash and stock deal valued at approximately US$1.6 billion. The acquisition was completed on February 28, 2025.

== Products ==
=== Cameras ===
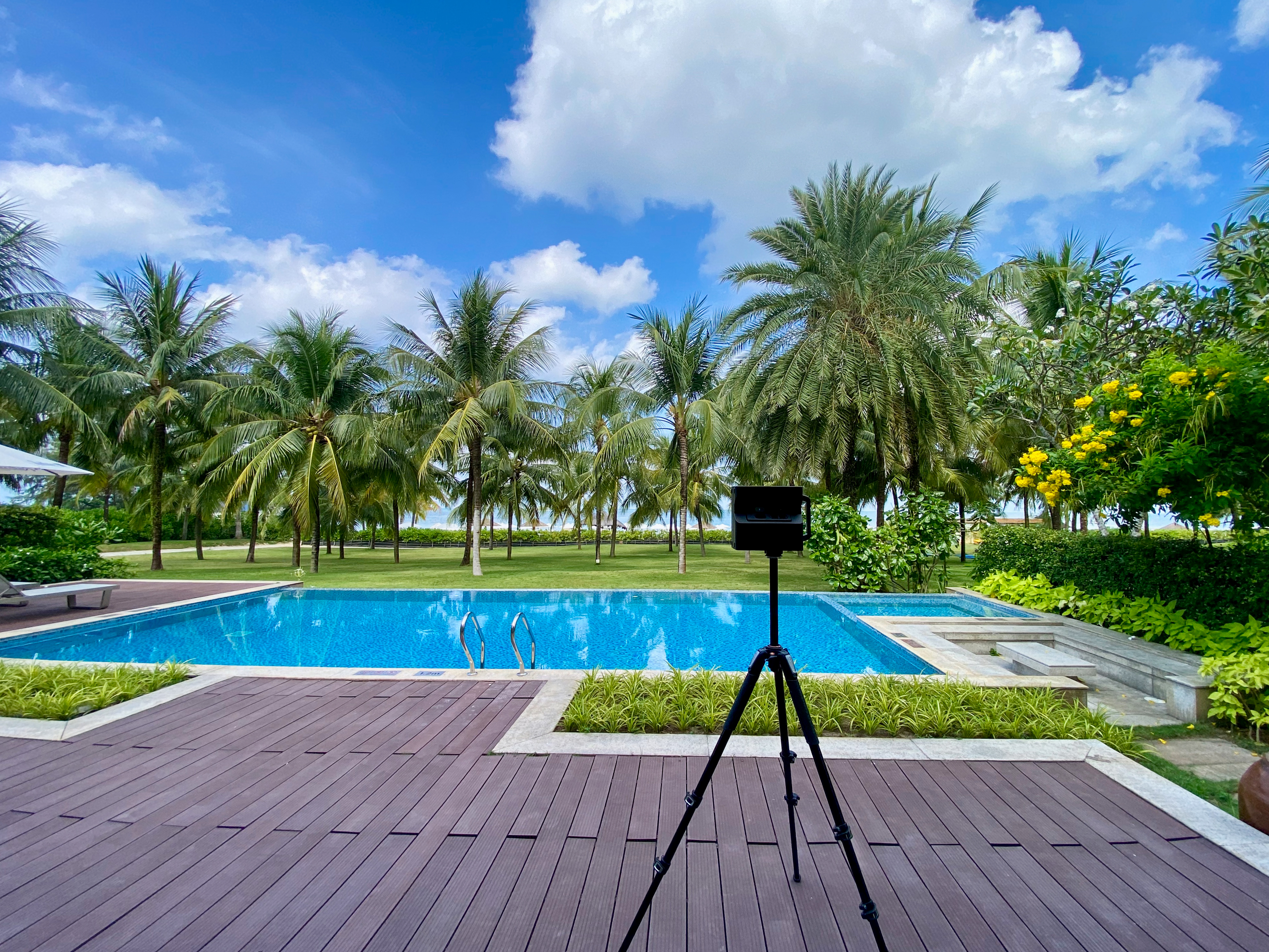
A Matterport Pro2 camera set up on a tripod by a resort pool in Phu Quoc, Vietnam.

On March 13, 2014, Matterport launched their first camera named 'Pro 3D', targeting contractors, real estate companies and architects, alongside a subscription-based cloud service and a web-based content player.

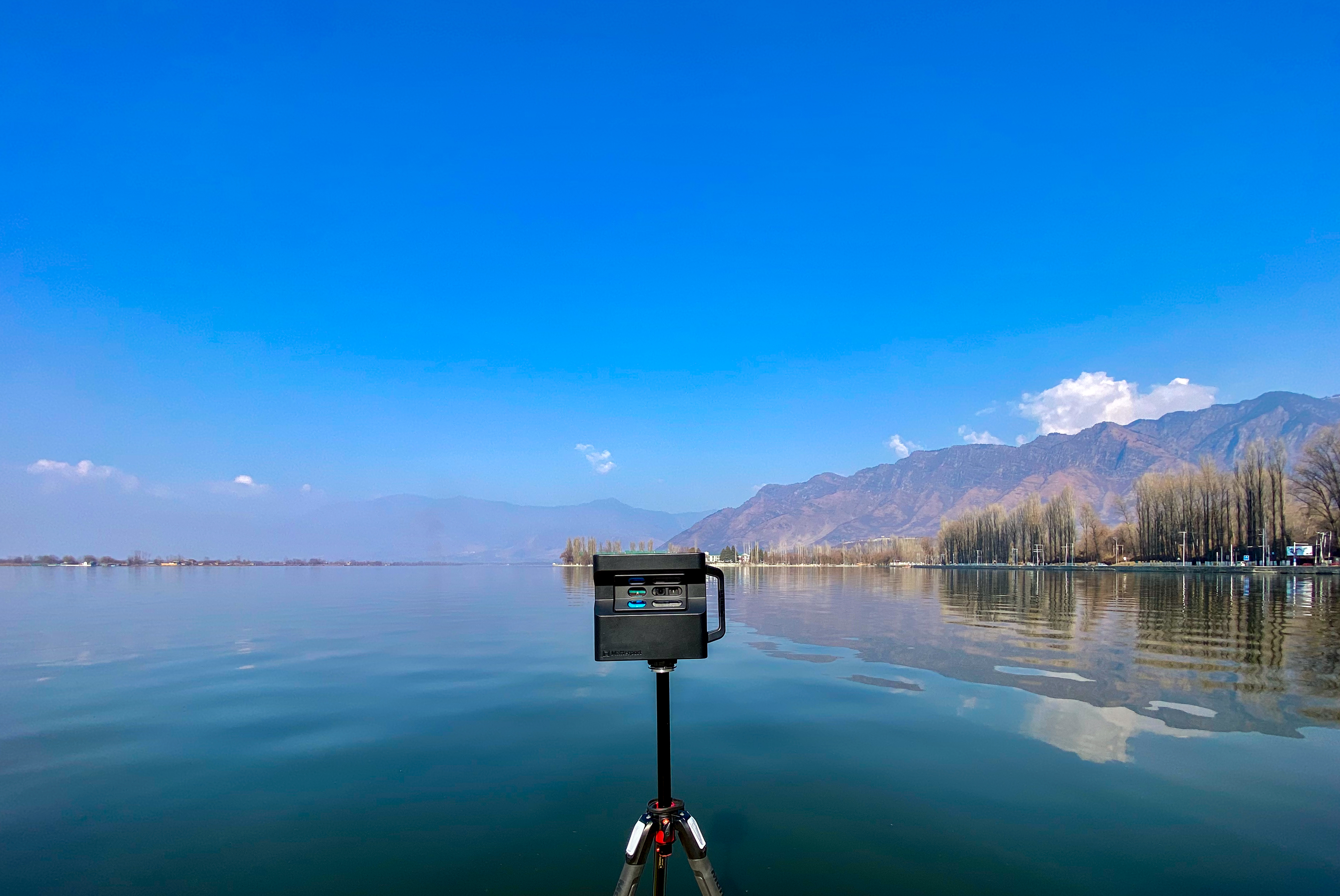
The Pro2 demonstrating its outdoor 360° capture capability at Dal Lake, Srinagar.

In June 2017, Matterport launched their second camera, named 'Pro2', as an upgraded version of their first camera, featuring improved resolution and geotagging capabilities. The company subsequently launched a cheaper version of the camera named 'Pro2 Lite' in February 2018.

In August 2022, Matterport launched a third camera named 'Pro3' as an upgrade to the 'Pro 2' camera, which features a LiDAR sensor.

=== Real estate and digital twin services ===
In 2016, Matterport developed a tool to generate floor plans from their camera images.

In January 2019, Matterport introduced a subscription-based platform called 'Cloud 3.0', which was supported by its image-processing artificial intelligence software known as Cortex. The platform aimed to lower the cost of entry into the 3D mapping technology space by enabling its software to be compatible with 360-degree cameras from other companies such as Insta360 and Ricoh (specifically Ricoh Theta).

== Collaborations ==
In 2014, Matterport collaborated with other companies such as Google on Project Tango, an augmented reality platform, and with Redfin to create a 3D walkthrough feature for real estate listings.

In July 2021, Matterport announced a collaboration with Facebook AI Research and released the Habitat-Matterport 3D Dataset (HM3D), a collection of 1000 digital twins generated from real-world environments that was intended for use in academic research such as in embodied artificial intelligence.

Matterport also partnered with Amazon Web Services to provide 3D models and data analytics to the AWS IoT TwinMaker, a digital twin implementation service by Amazon.
