= STR, Inc. =

Division of CoStar Group that provides market data on the hotel industry worldwide

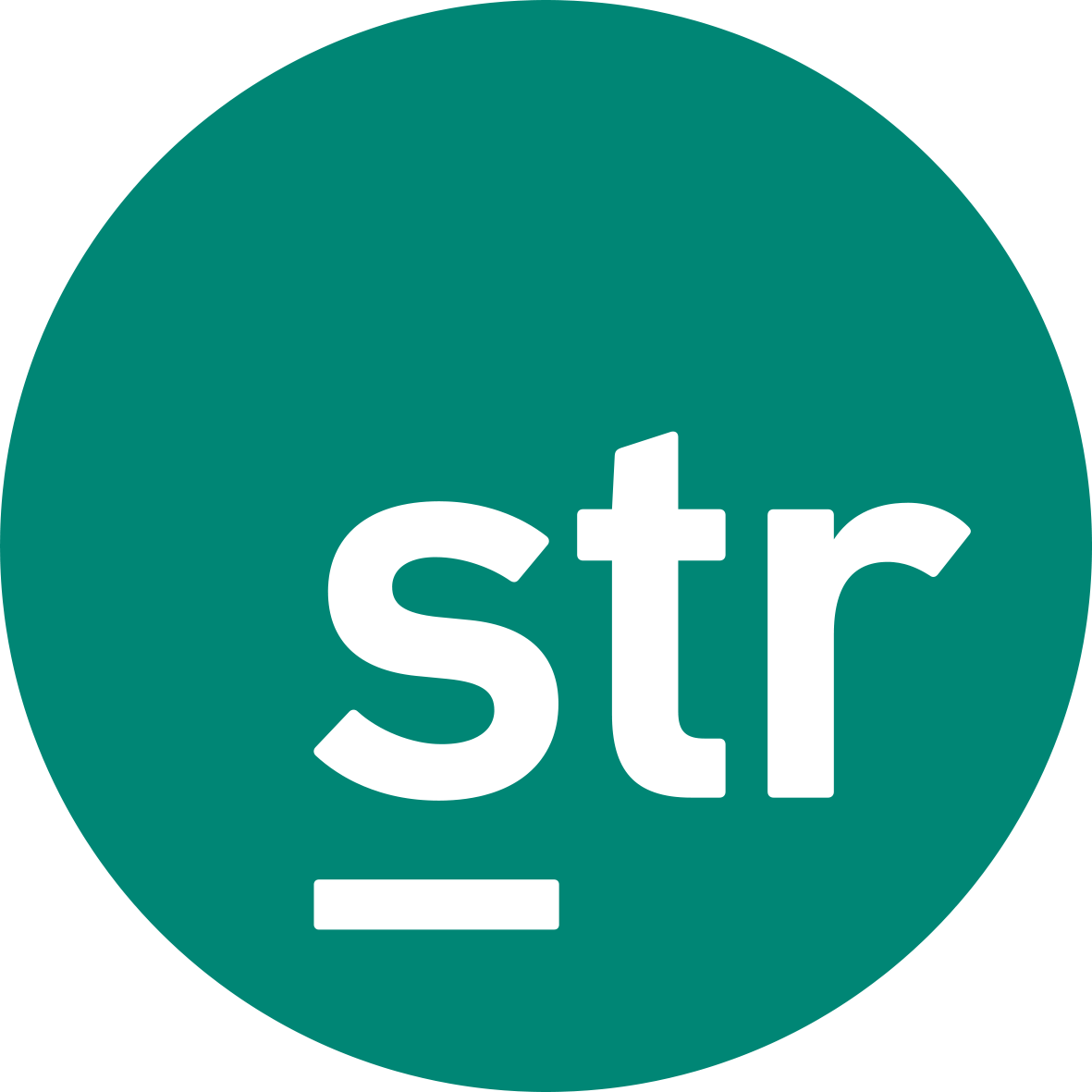
- Company type: Subsidiary
- Industry: Hotel
- Founded: 1985; 41 years ago
- Founders: Randy and Carolyn Smith
- Headquarters: Hendersonville, Tennessee; United States
- Area served: Worldwide
- Products: Data solutions for the hospitality industry
- Number of employees: 200
- Parent: CoStar Group
- Website: str.com

STR, Inc. is a subsidiary of CoStar Group that provides market data on the hotel industry worldwide, including supply and demand and market share data. The company has a corporate headquarters in Hendersonville, Tennessee, an international headquarters in London, England and offices in Italy, Dubai, Brazil, Singapore, Tokyo, Jakarta, Sydney, and Beijing.

STR currently tracks 67,000 hotels with over 8 million rooms in 180 countries.

The company is also the publisher of HotelNewsNow, a website with news on the hotel industry, headquartered in Lakewood, Ohio.

It is also the sponsor of the Hotel Data Conference.

== History ==
STR was founded in 1985 as Smith Travel Research by Randell A. Smith and his wife Carolyn Smith from their kitchen table in Lancaster, Pennsylvania.

They developed a database with names, addresses and phone numbers of hotels in the United States to create the Census Database. Randy Smith was contacted by Holiday Inn multiple times and urged to create a market share report.

In 1988, the company launched the first Smith Travel Accommodations Report (STAR), a monthly report that includes data from hotels and measures each property's market share performance against a self-selected competitive set.

In 2008, the company expanded internationally by acquiring HotelBenchmark, a division of Deloitte, and The Bench.

In 2008, the company launched HotelNewsNow, a website with news on the hotel industry.

In 2010, in partnership with Baird, the company launched the Baird / Smith Travel Research Hotel Stock Index, a stock market index which tracks the stock performance of 15 publicly traded companies in the hotel industry.

In 2016, STR acquired LJ Research, a market research agency, which was rebranded as Tourism Consumer Insights. LJ Research was based in Edinburgh, Scotland, and established in 1998. Lynn Jones, who led the Edinburgh and Lothian Tourist Board's research division, created a spin-off company, LJ Research. Two of LJ Research's products were Visitrac, the company's online survey system that is used for customer feedback, and LJ Forecaster, a hotel benchmarking system that monitored trends based on achieved and future performance.

In October 2019, the company was acquired by CoStar Group for $450 million.

== Antitrust lawsuit ==
In February 2024, a proposed consumer class action lawsuit was filed against CoStar, the parent company of STR, accusing the company of participating in a price-fixing conspiracy, in which it allegedly conspired with a group of luxury hotel operators, including Hilton, Hyatt, Marriott, InterContinental Hotels, Loews, and Accor, to keep hotel room prices artificially high, using research reports produced by STR to facilitate the sharing of competitively sensitive information among commercial rivals.
