= Livabl =

Canadian online real estate company founded 2009

- Former logo, using name that was dropped in 2022
- Industry: Online database Real estate
- Founded: 2009; 17 years ago
- Founder: Matthew Slutsky; Cliff Peskin
- Headquarters: Toronto, Ontario, Canada
- Area served: United States and Canada
- Parent: Zonda Home
- Website: www.livabl.com

Livabl provides an online database for new home construction and residential areas. Founded in 2009 as BuzzBuzzHome, the company is based in Toronto and has offices in Vancouver, New York City and Los Angeles.

For consumers, Livabl offers a free wiki-powered database of information regarding new developments in the United States and Canada including pricing, floor plans, renderings, and information on the builder and developer. Livabl also serves as a marketing tool for developers, brokers, and marketing agencies. Livabl employs research staff who update developer pages, and the wiki format of the website allows registered developers to update their own listings directly. For an additional monthly fee, developers can have their projects featured prominently.

== History ==
BuzzBuzzHome was founded in 2009 by Matthew Slutsky and Cliff Peskin in Toronto.

In 2012, the company opened an office in New York City, its first in the United States.

In March 2018, the company launched a platform to sign sales contracts and pay deposits for new home purchases online.

In April 2021, the company was acquired by Zonda Home, and was rebranded as Livabl in April 2022.
