= Commercial skipping =

Commercial skipping is a feature of some digital video recorders that makes it possible to automatically skip commercials in recorded programs. This feature created controversy, with major television networks and movie studios claiming it violates copyright and should be banned.

== History ==
After the video cassette recorder (VCR) became popular in the 1980s, the television industry began studying the impact of users fast forwarding through commercials. Advertising agencies fought the trend by making them more entertaining. For many years, video recorders manufactured for the Japanese market have been able to skip advertisements automatically, which is done by detecting when foreign language audio overdub tracks provided for many programmes go silent, as advertisements were broadcast with a single language only.

The first digital video recorder (DVR) with a built-in commercial skipping feature was ReplayTV with its "4000 Series" and "5000 Series" units. In 2002, the main television networks and movie studios sued ReplayTV, claiming that skipping advertisements during replay violates copyright. Later, five owners of ReplayTV represented by Electronic Frontier Foundation and attorneys Ira Rothken and Richard Wiebe countersued, asking the federal judge to uphold consumers' rights to record TV shows and skip commercials, claiming that features like commercial skipping help parents protect their kids from excessive consumerism. ReplayTV ended up filing for bankruptcy in 2003 after fighting a copyright infringement suit over the ReplayTV's ability to skip commercials.

=== Commercial skipping software ===
In addition to the DVR devices which existed in the private market since the late 1990s, towards the mid-2000s, due to the significant advances in home computers, Home theater PCs started gaining popularity in the private market and many users began using their Home theater PCs in their living room for entertainment purposes.

Following this, many DVR programs were developed, including popular programs such as Windows Media Center, which contained all of the features of the DVR devices in addition to advanced features such as HDTV and the use of Multiple TV Tuner Cards. Some independent developers began developing independent software capable of skipping the commercial segments when playing recorded videos, and permanently removing the commercial segments from recorded video files.

By 2014, many DVR programs such as Windows Media Center, SageTV and MythTV had the capability to skip commercials segments in recorded TV broadcasts after installing third-party add-ons such as DVRMSToolbox, Comskip and ShowAnalyzer, which use various advanced techniques to locate the commercial segments in the video files and save their locations to text files. The text files can also be fed into programs such as MEncoder or DVRMSToolboxGUI which can delete the commercial segments from the recorded video files.

A few third-party tools such as MCEBuddy automate detection and removal/marking of commercials.

One of the weaknesses of commercial skippers is that, operating automatically, they may misidentify program material as a commercial. Some programs like MCEBuddy provide the ability to fine-tune commercial detection for groups of files (e.g. by channel or country) and provide tools to manually fine-tune commercial segments for individual files.

In May 2012, the US Dish Network began offering a DVR with what it calls AutoHop. The device would automatically skip commercials when displaying programming that the viewer had previously recorded with the PrimeTime Anytime feature. It does not skip ads on any live programs. US broadcasters were angered at the news, and FOX embarked on legal action. Most, but not all, of Fox's claims were dismissed; ultimately an agreement was reached whereby AutoHop would only become available for Fox stations seven days after a program is transmitted; terms of the settlement were not disclosed.

== The future of TV advertisements ==
The introduction of digital video recorders and services with skipping and fast-forward capabilities enables viewers to avoid viewing interruptive advertisements in recorded programs, either manually or automatically. While advertising separate to television shows can be skipped, advertising in TV shows themselves ("product placement") cannot be skipped. Streaming services such as Hulu show shorter advertisements with a countdown timer and tailored to the viewers interests, asking interactive questions like "Is this ad relevant to you?".

== See also ==
- Ad blocking
- User operation prohibition
