= Criticism of Dish Network =

Dish Network has been the subject of a number of criticisms relating to management of advertising, disclosure of fees, telemarketing, employee rights and programming disputes; a number of which resulted in lawsuits. In the early 2000s, Dish Network received criticism regarding controversial technology and carriage disputes with programming providers. Most notably, when the Hopper digital video recorder provided an easy way for viewers to watch certain programming without commercials, major networks sued Dish Network.

== AutoHop ==
Dish Network's Hopper digital video recorder, announced in January 2012, led to controversy over a feature, called "AutoHop", which allows viewers to watch some programming without commercials, subject to time restrictions.

AutoHop is an extension of the DVR's prime time recording capability. When activated, the feature records but hides commercials, giving viewers the option of viewing primetime programming on the four major networks commercial-free. Commercials cannot be skipped until 1 am Eastern Time, and the viewer must choose to do this. Recorded programs are available for eight days after they have aired. News of AutoHop met with an immediate, polarized response. The feature was deemed a "dream come true" for consumers, but for networks, a nightmare undercutting the revenue model. Dish asserted that AutoHop would encourage its customers to sample new programming. Leslie Moonves, CBS chief executive, asked rhetorically how he is to produce CSI without the revenue stream of commercials. News Corporation refused to accept Dish advertising for the device. A Forrester Research analyst said the move demonstrated Dish's desperation to keep customers at a time when alternative programming is readily available via the Internet.

The controversy surrounding AutoHop contributed to one small-market station group, Hoak Media Corporation, removing its 14 stations channels from the service on June 6, 2012. In negotiations, Hoak sought a 200 percent increase in carriage fees and the dropping of the AutoHop feature. David Shull, Dish senior vice president of programming, accused Hoak of effectively telling Dish's customers that they must watch commercials, disrespecting customer control over its services. Eight days later, the two companies announced a distribution deal. Terms were not disclosed.

On June 27, 2012, Dish Chairman Charlie Ergen told the United States House Subcommittee on Communications and Technology that the feature would enable parents to protect their children from alcohol and fast food advertising. The next day, Michael Petricone of the Consumer Electronics Association spoke to the subcommittee, likening Hopper to earlier time shifting devices. He argued that Hopper is legal and that AutoHop entices people to watch more television, thereby expanding television's market.

CNET was also forced by parent company CBS to disqualify the newest Hopper with Sling model from the CES Best in Show award for 2013 because of its active litigation with the company. CEO Joe Clayton said that Dish was "saddened that CNET's staff is being denied its editorial independence because of CBS' heavy-handed tactics." Dish Network directly attacked CBS for its decision in an advertisement for the device on its website. The ad proclaimed the DVR as being CNET's "Best in Show", but with a footnote stating that "CBS will go to any lengths to keep you from enjoying ad-skipping technology—even censoring its own writers and throwing out their decision to name Hopper 'Best In Show.' Your vote is the only one that really matters."

== Telemarketing violations ==
Dish Network independent dealers have repeatedly been charged and fined for employing illegal telemarketing tactics, such as violating do not call lists and making calls in which a live telemarketer does not connect promptly after the call is answered. Dish Network terminated agreements with some independent dealers in relation to these charges. In March 2009 the Federal Trade Commission charged Dish Network and two of its dealers with multiple violations of the FTC's Telemarketing Sales Rule and the Telephone Consumer Protection Act of 1991.

== Fee disclosures ==
In January 2004, thirteen states charged that Echostar, then the parent company of Dish Network, had not disclosed termination fees to potential customers and had debited customers' bank accounts for hidden fees. The company settled the lawsuit, paid $5 million, and promised to disclose all terms prior to signing contracts with potential customers.

Dish has also begun to collect shipping fees on equipment that needs to be returned after customers cancel their service with Dish. The shipping cost as of Sept. 2014 is $17. This fee applies regardless of whether the fee was included in the initial contract customers signed.

== Programming disagreements ==
Dish Network has a lengthy history of carriage disputes.

=== QTN ===
Dish Network began negotiations with GTN (Gay Television Network) to carry the channel. GTN sent out a press release on February 2, 2001, announcing its launch and that its channel would be carried by Dish Network. Dish Network responded by denying that any contract had been signed and that the press release was premature. The president of GTN responded by calling Dish Network "homophobic". In April 2002, Dish Network signed a contract to carry GTN, renamed to Triangle Television Network, then Q Television Network (QTN). As of May 29, 2009 Dish Network now offers the Logo channel (HD only) in an add-on package (Blockbuster @Home) along with 16 other HD channels for a $10 monthly fee.

=== CBS Corporation/Viacom ===
In early 2004, CBS/Viacom pulled its networks and local channels from Dish Network including channels from MTV Networks (MTV, Nickelodeon, VH1, etc.), BET, as well as 10 CBS O&O stations after talks with them and Echostar broke down. The blackout only lasted for 2 days after both parties reached a deal.

Almost 11 years after the original dispute with Viacom/CBS, Dish faced a dispute with CBS Corporation, which had split from Viacom in early 2006. In the dispute, several CBS O&O stations, as well as all the channels of Showtime would originally be slated to be removed on November 20. However Dish reached 2 short-term extension agreements, the first on the date of the original deadline and the second short-term agreement was reached on the afternoon of the last day of the original extension agreement of November 26. Then CBS announced on December 2 that they would have removed the stations on the evening of December 4 if a new deal wasn't reached by then. Dish then got another short-term agreement to extend the deadline by one day. On December 5, Dish dropped CBS O&O stations in 14 markets Then on December 6, a day later, DISH and CBS reached a multi-year deal that would restore the CBS O&O stations in 14 markets as well as allow DISH customers to continue watching Showtime, The Movie Channel, Flix, CBS Sports Network, TVGN (which became Pop in early 2015) and would bring back Smithsonian Channel and DISH also added Showtime Anytime, and would allow CBS program to have ad-skip for their programming for Dish's Primetime Anytime on the Hopper DVR systems 7 days after the shows originally aired, which is 4 days longer than Disney/ABC's deal for the ad-skip feature. 14 TV stations owned by CBS were still carried. In early 2016, Dish announced the removal of all Viacom channels set for the night of April 20. Although Viacom says it offered Dish financial terms "as good as larger distributors," the No. 2 satellite company "made demands that are designed to be impossible to meet in order to take our negotiations public and likely force our programming off the air."

=== Disney/ABC/ESPN ===
On August 4, 2009, Dish Network sued ESPN for $1 million in a federal lawsuit, alleging that it had breached its contract by not extending the same carriage terms the programmer provided to Comcast and DirecTV for ESPNU and ESPN Classic. The lawsuit claims ESPN violated the "Most Favored Nations" clause.

The next day, ESPN announced they will fight the lawsuit and said in a press release: "We have repeatedly advised Dish Network that we are in full compliance with our agreement and have offered them a distribution opportunity with respect to ESPNU and ESPN Classic consistent with the rest of the industry. We will not renegotiate settled contracts and will vigorously defend this legal action, the apparent sole purpose of which is to get a better deal."

Dish Network moved ESPNU from its "America's Top 250" package to its "America's Top 120" package on September 30, 2009. However, they claim it has nothing to do with the lawsuit.

On June 22, 2010, The Walt Disney Company (owner of ESPN) pulled ESPNews HD, Disney Channel HD, Disney XD HD and ABC Family HD from the Dish Network channel list because of Dish's "Free HD for Life" campaign, although the standard definition channels remained.

Disney later sued Dish because of the Hopper system which allows the stripping of commercials from their networks, and the animus affected both to the point where the original carriage agreement which expired in October 2013 was extended due to the Hopper, ESPN and HD issues while those were worked out to prevent the loss of access to Disney-ABC networks.

Dish and Disney finally came to terms on all of the issues on March 4, 2014, which will allow Disney to launch Disney Junior, Fusion, ESPN Goal Line, the Longhorn Network and SEC Network on Dish, along with the launch or return of HD feeds for their other networks, along with mobile app access to Disney-ABC networks via Dish's TV Everywhere logins. ESPN Classic was returned solely as a video on demand option causing Disney to agree by dropping legal action against Dish for the Hopper system in exchange for programming recorded on ABC stations by Hopper DVR's being denied from having their advertising stripped until 3 days after its original broadcast.

Disney's channels went dark again on Dish and Sling TV on September 30, 2022. The blackout ended almost 48 hours later.

=== The Weather Channel ===
On May 20, 2010, Dish Network announced that it was dropping The Weather Channel at midnight ET that day in favor of its own similar weather information channel, The Weather Cast. The switch was due to high rates that The Weather Channel demanded Dish Network to pay (The Weather Channel requested a rate increase from 11 cents per subscriber per month to 12 cents). As of May 24, The Weather Channel stated that it had come to an agreement with Dish Network that would result in Dish Network carrying The Weather Channel for the next several years. Despite the earlier announcement that The Weather Channel would be dropped, the channel was never officially removed from Dish Network. The Weather Cast was discontinued in anticipation of a Weatherscan-based service that would provide local weather information for Dish Network customers. The financial terms of the deal remain undisclosed at this time.

=== Fox dispute ===
A month-long negotiation between Dish and Fox over licensing fees took place in October 2010, with Dish Network temporarily losing FX, the National Geographic Channel, and regional FSN channels. The two companies gave divergent accounts of the negotiations: Dish claimed that Fox was seeking a 20 percent hike in licensing fees; Fox disputed the number. The parties settled on October 29, two days before their agreement was set to expire. Terms were not disclosed.

For much of the summer of 2013, Dish, along with Time Warner Cable and DirecTV had been in a dispute whether to carry the new Fox Sports 1 formerly Speed, the new Fox Sports 2 formerly Fuel TV and the new FXX channel formerly Fox Soccer. On August 14, just three days before the launch of FS1, all three providers reached an agreement to carry those Fox channels.

For two weeks ending October 6, 2019, Dish Network also had to remove Fox owned local channels due to an expired retransmission consent agreement. Fox News and Fox affiliates in smaller markets were not included in the outage.

=== MSG Network dispute ===
On October 1, 2010, Dish Network subscribers lost the MSG and MSG Plus regional sports networks due to a contract dispute with Madison Square Garden, Inc. MSG called on Dish Network to resume negotiations and reconsider its proposals but there was still no agreement as of September 15, 2013. MSG is linking carriage of these networks to their sister network Fuse, which was replaced with Palladia in July 2010. However, in October 2012, Dish brought back Fuse, along with the AMC networks, so customers can enjoy both Fuse and Palladia. However, as of April 2017, Dish has not restored either MSG Network nor MSG Plus.

=== Belo Corp. ===
On October 29, 2010, it was announced that Belo Corporation and Dish Network were in a carriage dispute regarding rates. ABC affiliates WFAA in Dallas, Texas, KVUE in Austin, Texas, CBS affiliates KHOU in Houston, Texas, WWL-TV in New Orleans, Louisiana, Fox affiliate KMSB in Tucson, Arizona and 10 other local stations are affected. Two days later, both Belo and Dish Network reached an agreement, avoiding a service interruption. Belo had offered Dish Network an extension while negotiations were taking place. Had there been no agreement made by October 31 at midnight (all time zones), Belo would have pulled these channels from Dish Network. If the Fox Networks dispute would've continued throughout that time period, this combination would've created the biggest blow to Dish Network customers since Echostar's disagreement with CBS/Viacom in 2004.

=== SportsNet New York (SNY) ===
On April 1, 2011, Dish Network pulled SportsNet New York (which broadcasts New York Mets games) from its channel lineup due to a carriage dispute. As a result, Dish Network becomes the only satellite provider not to carry any Regional Sports Networks in the New York area. As of April 2017, Dish has still not returned SNY to its channel lineup.

=== Heritage Broadcasting Group of Michigan ===
On December 15, 2011, Dish Network pulled WWTV and WFQX, stations in the Northern Michigan television market owned by Heritage Broadcasting, citing "an outrageous fee increase". The dispute was resolved on December 20, restoring those two channels to the lineup. The same 2 channels were again pulled from the DISH Network lineup on May 28, 2015, due to another retransmission consent dispute, and were not restored for 3 months of being off the DISH lineup.

=== AMC Networks ===
On March 4, 2012, Dish Network announced that it would no longer carry the AMC Networks family of cable channels upon the expiration of the satellite provider's distribution agreement with the company at the end of June 2012, citing that AMC Networks charged an excessive amount in retransmission consent payments from the service for their carriage and low audience viewership for the channels.

AMC Networks responded to Dish's announcement of its pending removal of the channels as being related to a 2008 breach of contract lawsuit against Dish Network by former company parent Rainbow Media's Voom HD Networks, in which it is seeking more than $2.5 billion in damages against Dish for improperly terminating its carriage contract; Voom's high-definition channels were carried on the provider from May 1, 2005, until May 12, 2008, when Dish removed ten of Voom's fifteen channels from its lineup (the five remaining Voom HD channels were removed from Dish the day after). However, Dish states that the lawsuit is unrelated to the decision to remove the AMC Networks channels and that it ended the carriage agreement on its own terms.

On May 20, 2012, Dish Network removed Sundance Channel from its channel lineup. Two weeks later on June 4, 2012, Dish relocated AMC, WE tv, and IFC to higher channel positions with AMC being split into two separate standard definition and high definition channel feeds; the former channel lineup spaces occupied by the three channels were respectively replaced with HDNet, Style and MoviePlex multiplex channel Indieplex. The move is believed to be in response to an ad run during a June 3 airing of an episode of Mad Men urging Dish Network customers to inform the company to keep the three AMC Networks channels on the satellite provider with Dish stating that the relocated channel positions better reflect the channels' ratings.

On June 30, 2012, Dish dropped the three AMC Networks properties, replacing AMC with HDNet movies, IFC with HDNet, and WE tv with Style. The move coincided with a new agreement between Dish and AT&T U-verse.

On July 12, 2012, AMC said in an e-mailed statement that it would stream over the Internet the season premiere of "Breaking Bad" to DISH customers. "Dish subscribers can register online starting July 13 for the show, which airs on July 15. We want to give Dish customers an extra week to switch providers so they can enjoy the rest of the season."

On October 21, 2012, AMC Networks announced a settlement was reached between them, Cablevision and Dish in which Dish was forced to pay up to $700 Million in damages to Cablevision for damages from removing Voom owned channels off the Dish Lineup back in 2008, and in return Dish signed a new agreement to bring the AMC networks owned channels back on the Dish lineup with AMC returning October 21 and the rest on November 1. Also, DISH simultaneously brought back FUSE, and all 4 channels were moved from "America's Top 200" to 120. The 14 NBCUniversal properties were dropped in 2016, the NBCUniversal properties are currently still on Dish.

=== Big Ten Network ===
On August 27, 2012, Big Ten Network (BTN) and Dish Network (Dish) began a dispute over the extant contract. This contract expired on August 31, 2012, the day before the college football season started. On September 1, 2012, Big Ten Network and Dish Network entered into a short-term arrangement and avoided a blackout. By September 14, 2012, the parties had failed to reach further agreement and BTN was dropped from the Dish lineup. On September 22, 2012, the Big Ten Network and Dish reached an agreement, returning BTN to the Dish lineup.

=== Gannett Company ===
In October 2012, Gannett Company threatened to pull all 23 of its television stations (serving 19 U.S. markets) from Dish Network. Though retransmission consent compensation is an issue with the dispute, Gannett also demands that the satellite provider discontinue the AutoHop commercial-skipping feature on its digital video recorders.

Narrowly averting a blackout, Gannett Company reached a long-term carriage agreement with Dish Network for all 23 of its television stations to remain on the satellite provider. The deal was reached despite reported contentious demands reportedly made by Gannett for Dish to disable its AutoHop ad-skipping feature on its digital video recorders or pay a "massive penalty" of a 300% increase in carriage fees (claims that Gannett publicly denied).

=== WWE pay-per-view events ===
In September 2011, WWE announced it would launch its own 24/7 TV Network, the original plan was for the network to launch on April 1, 2012, to coincide with WrestleMania XXVII on several cable and satellite TV providers, however, Dish and its competition in the cable and satellite TV industry in the United States declined and it sat the network's launch two years back. Then on January 8, 2014, at a press conference for the Consumer Electronics Show, WWE announced that the WWE Network would launch as an Internet TV network with an on-demand streaming service similar to Netflix in which they also announced that all pay-per-view events starting with WrestleMania XXX would air on the network for free as part of the subscription to the network in which people would pay for it at a fixed price with a six-month commitment. This decision did not set in with all cable and satellite TV providers as this would devalue the monthly WWE pay per views as they charge a price that would be higher than what the monthly price of the online service would cost. DirecTV and Comcast had considered removing the pay per views from their lineup.

It was revealed on February 19, days before the February pay-per-view event Elimination Chamber and the network's launch on the day after the pay per view that Dish would not carry Elimination Chamber and all WWE pay per view events from that point forward.

Dish cited in a statement that "WWE has chosen to launch a 24/7 online network, without its TV partners, that includes all of its pay-per-view events. As WWE enters the increasingly fragmented media world by themselves, DISH will continue to consider the value of WWE pay-per-view on an event by event basis. DISH continues to provide a variety of WWE programming, including 'WWE Raw' on USA, 'WWE Smackdown' on Syfy, 'WWE Main Event' on Ion and 'WWE Total Divas" on E!. At this time, WWE pay-per-view events are not available on DISH".

Meanwhile, WWE released a statement in response to Dish's decision to pull WWE pay per views in which WWE said "WWE is pleased that the majority of our cable and satellite pay-per-view distributors are giving our fans an option to purchase traditional Pay-Per-Views as we prepare to launch WWE Network on Monday, February 24. Unfortunately, Dish will not be doing so. We hope Dish will reconsider for this Sunday's 'Elimination Chamber' pay-per-view event and especially for 'WrestleMania 30." Dish later made a decision to air Wrestlemania XXX.

=== Fox Sports South ===
In April 2013, Dish Network declined to pay Fox Sports for 47 Braves games. These games were acquired by Fox from WPCH-TV two months prior in February. Dish Network claimed it didn't want to pay a "significant" local surcharge, however, all others major providers (AT&T U-verse, Xfinity, DirecTV, and Charter) agreed to FSS's terms. The dispute lasted three years until Fox and Dish Network finally came to terms on March 15, 2016, less than three weeks before the start of the 2016 season.

=== Hearst Television ===
On April 8, 2014, at 10 pm EDT, Hearst Television forced Dish Network to remove its 29 stations off of the provider because they failed to reach a Retransmission consent agreement. After a 14-hour blackout, the channels were restored. In March 2017, Dish Network again had to remove Hearst Television owned channels due to an expired retransmission consent agreement. On April 26, 2017, the Hearst stations were restored on Dish. On September 8, 2023, Dish removed Hearst stations again for the same reason. On November 11, 2023, the Hearst stations were restored.

=== Diversified Communications ===
Early on the morning of July 16, 2014, WABI-TV and WABI DT-2 The CW were removed from Dish Network due to agreement expiring the issues are for the contract talks breaking down are the Designated Market Area issues (DMA), Financial terms, and other issues. The DMA issues are moving a number of counties in Maine to another CBS station instead of WABI which currently broadcasts now it likely would use WGME the Portland area affiliate if the new contract was to be approved. .

=== Turner Networks ===
On October 21, 2014, during the early morning hours, Dish entered a dispute with Time Warner's Turner Broadcasting System. Dish removed CNN, HLN, Cartoon Network/Adult Swim, Boomerang, TruTV, Turner Classic Movies, and CNN en Español as the contract to carry those channels expired on October 20. TBS and TNT were not removed, as they are carried under a different contract. Dish pulled the channels without warning and Dish and Turner didn't let their customers know about the dispute before the expiration of their deal as normally Dish would warn about a potential channel removal. Dish replaced CNN and HLN with MSNBC, replaced Cartoon Network with Nicktoons (except for the West Feed which was replaced by a message about the removal of the channels), replaced Boomerang with the Nick Jr. Channel, replaced Turner Classic Movies with FXM, and replaced TruTV with Esquire Network during the duration of the dispute. The dispute was settled and the Turner Network Channels restored on November 21, 2014.

=== NBC Sports Group affiliates ===
On August 6, 2014, Dish Network dropped NBC Sports New England. Comcast has also threatened to remove NBCS affiliates in Chicago, Baltimore/Washington, and the Bay Area by December 1 if a deal is not reached. Comcast agreed to a short-term extension for the four Regional Sports Networks, and on December 20, it was announced that Dish and Comcast agreed to a multi-year extension for Dish to continue to broadcast NBCS Chicago, NBCS Washington, NBCS California, and NBCS Bay Area.

=== Fox News/Fox Business ===
On December 21, 2014, Dish Network dropped Fox News Channel and Fox Business Network. A failed first attempt to reach a deal on the 18th resulted in the blackout. Fox and Dish blamed each other over this period; Dish saying Fox were tying in a sister channel and charging unreasonable rates. Fox pointed out the recent pattern Dish had created with other networks. A deal was finally reached on January 14, 2015, with terms undisclosed. Update: The new deal is 1.50 for each subscriber on Dish Network, up 50% from the old deal of 1.00 per.

=== UFC pay-per-view events ===
On April 22, 2015, Ultimate Fighting Championship announced that Dish Network will not carry further pay-per-view events from the mixed martial arts promoter, starting with UFC 186, citing contractual issues. UFC advised Dish customers to subscribe to its UFC.TV over-the-top streaming service, or watch at a venue served by another television provider. According to a Dish representative, the company is still in negotiations with UFC for future event carriage.

=== Sinclair Broadcast Group ===
On August 25, 2015, Dish Network dropped 129 stations in 79 markets owned and/or operated by Sinclair Broadcast Group, in what has been called the largest single blackout in pay-TV history. Dish claims that Sinclair is strong-arming them into carrying a cable network Sinclair is looking to acquire in addition to the local stations. Sinclair has rebutted by stating that Dish is "trying to spin the facts in an apparent effort to make a political statement." A day later, a new agreement was reached and the channels were restored.

=== Tegna, Inc. ===
On October 9, 2015, Tegna-owned 46 stations in 38 markets were blacked out after the two parties failed to come to an agreement. This affected 9 markets where the Red River Showdown was airing Saturday October 10 on ABC affiliates, including WFAA in Dallas, KVUE in Austin, KIII in Corpus Christi and KBMT in Beaumont. It wasn't until Sunday, October 11 that TEGNA and Dish reached a new multi-year agreement to restore the channels. No terms have been disclosed, but it was noted that the NFL games scheduled to air that day on TEGNA's Fox, CBS and NBC affiliates helped the urgency of negotiations.

=== Tribune Broadcasting ===
Tribune Broadcasting announced that its 42 television stations in 33 markets and basic cable network WGN America were pulled from Dish Network on June 12 at 7 p.m. (Eastern) after the two sides failed to reach a new retransmission agreement. This affected 7 markets where the 70th Annual Tony Awards were airing on CBS affiliates (including WHNT-TV in Huntsville, AL; KFSM-TV in Fort Amith, AR; WTTV in Bloomington, IN; and 5 others) that same evening an hour after the previous retransmission contract ended. This also impacts major market CW affiliates KDAF in Dallas, KIAH in Houston, WPIX in New York City, KTLA in Los Angeles, and Tribune's flagship WGN-TV in Chicago (which switched to being an independent station on September 1). Dish proposed having an arbitrator to settle the dispute. Meanwhile, Tribune proposed to have the FCC chairman monitor negotiations between the two companies. As the blackout reached its 2nd week, Dish sues Tribune over their "Dump Dish" campaign, accusing them of deceptive claims about worst customer service and hindering contracts with its customers, damaging the provider's good reputation. Tribune responded to said lawsuit calling it "frivolous", and stated that they "repeatedly offered Dish an extension through August 31, 2016, which Dish has continually rejected." Throughout this spat, Dish customers in markets affected also missed out on Games 5, 6, and 7 of a historic 2016 NBA Finals and Game 6 of the 2016 Stanley Cup Finals on Tribune-owned ABC and NBC affiliates respectively. Dish Chairman and CEO Charlie Ergen said that the satellite distributor is prepared for the long-haul, adding that if necessary he could do without the channels indefinitely. Ergen also states that the longer this dispute continues, the less valuable the Tribune stations and cabler WGN America will be. As the blackout continued through August, customers in affected markets already missed NBC's coverage of the 2016 Summer Olympics in its entirety on its Tribune-owned affiliates, although NBC's sister cable networks were also showing select events. They also missed most of the NFL Preseason games on its CBS, Fox, ABC, and NBC affiliates.

It wasn't until September 4, 2016, when the 2 parties finally came to an agreement to make Tribune's stations and WGN America available again to Dish customers. The terms of such have not been disclosed.

=== Nexstar Media Group ===
A carriage dispute with Nexstar Media Group, beginning at 7:00 p.m. Eastern Time on December 2, 2020, resulted in the removal of at least 164 Nexstar stations in 115 markets, covering about 63% of TV homes, from Dish Network. A new deal was announced by Christmas Day.

=== New England Sports Network (NESN) ===
On December 21, 2021, Dish Network dropped the New England Sports Network (NESN), home of the Boston Red Sox (MLB) and Boston Bruins (NHL), from their channel lineup after both sides could not come to an retransmission agreement. This leaves competitor DirecTV as the only satelitte TV provider to carry any Regional Sports Networks in the United States, as Dish has dropped other RSN's (most notably the NBC Sports and Bally Sports regional networks) within the past decade.

== Lawsuits ==
On May 24, 2012, Dish and the networks filed suit in federal court, the Dish case in Manhattan and the networks' cases in Los Angeles. On May 30, U.S. District Judge Laura Taylor Swain ruled the networks' cases should not be filed in Los Angeles and asked for comments on a possible move of all cases to New York.

On July 9 preliminary judgement, Swain denied Dish's request to set aside the issue of copyright violation, ruling that Dish's argument lacked specificity. She also ruled that the case could be heard in Los Angeles, thereby eliminating New York as a potential venue.

On November 7, 2012, the United States District Court for the Central District of California denied Fox's motion for preliminary injunction for the reasons mainly because (1) PTAT and AutoHop did not infringe copyright and did not breach the contract; and (2) while QA copies constituted a copyright infringement and breached the contract, the harm from the copies was not irreparable but was compensable with money.

Fox appealed to the United States Court of Appeals for the Ninth Circuit. On July 24, 2013, the Ninth Circuit reviewed the district court's decision with a very deferential standard of review, and affirmed it.

=== TiVo patent lawsuit ===
On June 3, 2009, satellite service provider EchoStar was found by Marshall, Texas, federal district court judge David Folsom to be in contempt of a permanent injunction against using some of TiVo's technology and was required to pay the DVR pioneer $103.1 million plus interest. On May 3, 2011, DISH Network Corporation and EchoStar Corporation agreed to pay TiVo Inc. $500 million to settle a dispute over the use of some of TiVo's technology.

This lawsuit took more than ten years to resolve. One of the judges involved said that the conduct of DISH's lawyers didn't "even meet law-school student behavior," and "presented the saddest day I have seen in my many years in court."

== Work environment ==
DISH fired a quadriplegic wheelchair user, Brandon Coats, from his job as a telephone operator in 2010 for using medical-marijuana during off-work hours. Coats used marijuana to control muscle spasms. His paralysis was due to injuries from a car crash. After Coats failed a random drug test, he sued, claiming that marijuana use was legal and that he was a model employee. His suit relied under a Colorado law called the Lawful Off-Duty Activities Statute that prohibits employers from firing employees for doing legal things during their personal time. The trial court and Colorado Court of Appeals ruled in Coats v. DISH Network that since marijuana is banned by federal law it does not qualify as legal activity despite being permitted by state law. The trial court ruled that Coats should have to pay DISH's legal fees; the appeals court overturned this ruling.

In 2012, the investment analysis and commentary site 24/7 Wall St. named Dish Network #1 among "America's Worst Companies To Work For," an assessment based upon employee reviews at the employment website Glassdoor.

== Frequency acquisition subsidies ==
DISH Network received about $3 billion in subsidies from the federal government to buy wireless bandwidth. DISH Network used the 1934 Federal Communications Act to win subsidies for the purchases it made at the January 2015 auction of wireless spectrum. Under the terms of that act, "designated entities" qualify for a 25 percent discount on the market price of such licenses. DISH used small subsidiaries such as Northstar Wireless and SNR Wireless in order to qualify. DISH only paid $10 billion for licenses that would have otherwise cost $13 billion. The difference would have been paid to the federal government. The FEC and the United States Senate opened investigations into the matter after numerous public complaints.

== Related party transactions ==
In 2012, DISH invested $500,000 in a technology startup, Yottabyte Ventures LLC, in which Christoper Ergen, the son of CEO Charlie Ergen, has 7.1 percent equity. Yottabytes develops mobile video applications. At the end of 2012, DISH held 71.4% of that company's equity. In 2011, DISH paid $100,000 to an online marketing company that Chase Ergen, another son of Charlie Ergen, owns 50% of. As part of a reseller agreement, DISH paid another firm owned by Chase Ergen $101,000 during 2010 and 2011. Candy Ergen, Charlie Ergen's wife, is paid between $100,000 to $110,000 per year in consulting fees. Other unnamed children of Ergen received about $25,000 in 2010 and 2011. These transactions were criticized by shareholder advocates due to the potential conflict of interests.

== Space debris ==
In 2023 DISH was fined $150,000 by the US Federal Communications Commission (FCC) for failing to retire its EchoStar VII satellite to an orbit 300nm higher than its synchronous orbit while in service as specified by the terms of its license. The company received permission to keep the satellite in service beyond its planned life after committing to monitor thruster fuel consumption for station keeping to ensure an ample supply remained for the retirement maneuvers, and to retire the satellite promptly if the thruster fuel supply became marginal. When retired the remaining thruster fuel supply was less than expected, only sufficient to lift the satellite to an orbit 117nm above geosynchronous orbit. This was the first fine ever issued to a company over the matter of "space debris".
