= CoStar Group =

American technology company

CoStar Group, Inc.

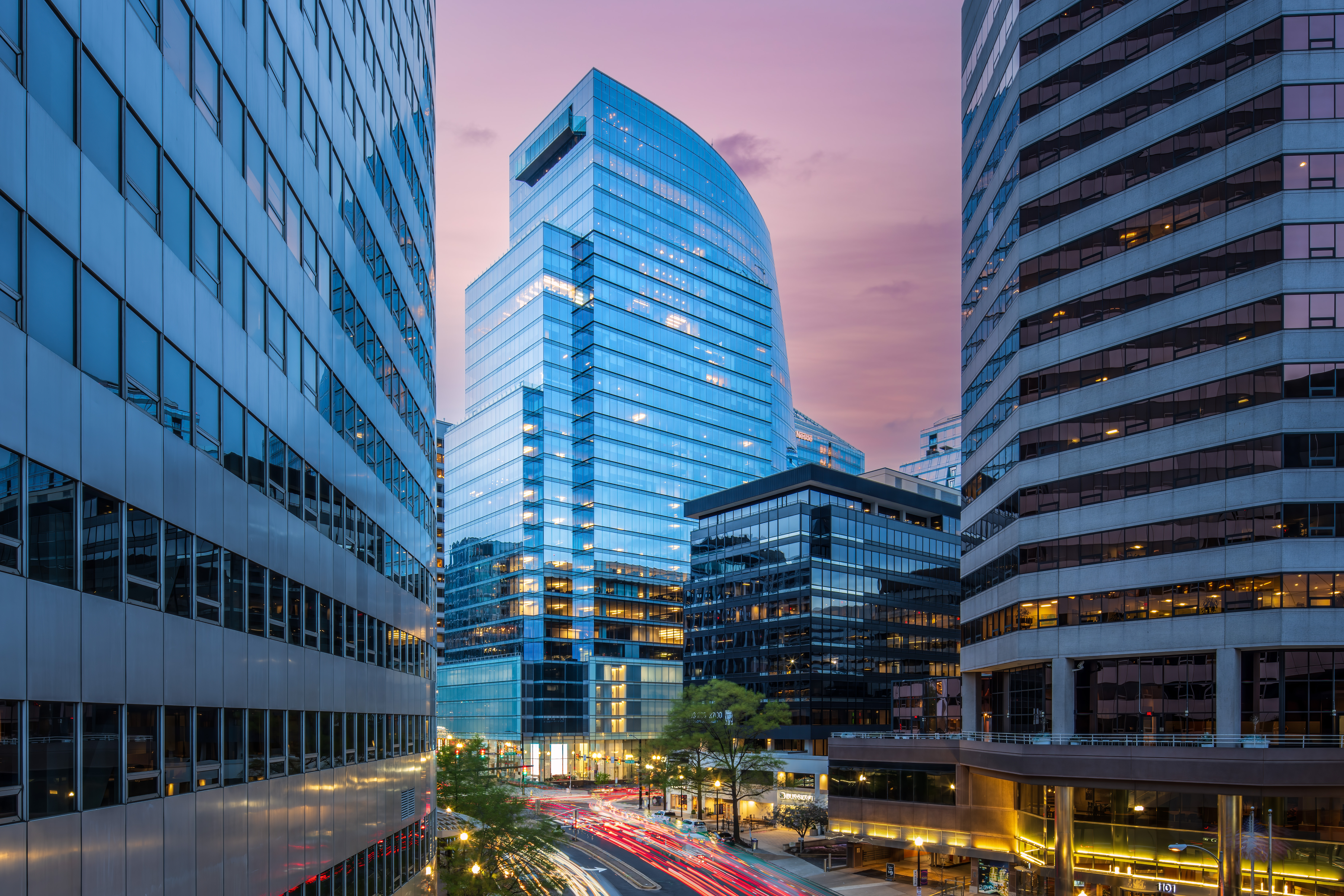
- Headquarters in Arlington, Virginia
- Type: Public
- Traded as: Nasdaq: CSGP; S&P 500 component
- Industry: Commercial property Residential property Technology company
- Founded: 1987; 39 years ago
- Founder: Andrew Florance
- Headquarters: Arlington, Virginia, U.S.
- Area served: Australia; Canada; France; Germany; Spain; United Kingdom; United States
- Key people: Andrew C. Florance (president and CEO); Louise S. Sams (chairman); Lisa Ruggles (SVP, global operations); Frank Simuro (CTO)
- Revenue: ▲US$3.25 billion (2025)
- Operating income: ▼US$(72) million (2025)
- Net income: ▼US$7 million (2025)
- Total assets: ▲US$10.54 billion (2025)
- Total equity: ▲US$8.33 billion (2025)
- Number of employees: 8,400 (2026)
- Subsidiaries: Apartments.com; Domain Group; Homes.com; LoopNet; Matterport; STR
- Website: costargroup.com

CoStar Group, Inc. is an American provider of information, analytics, and marketing services to the commercial property industry in North America and Europe. Founded in 1987 by Andrew C. Florance and based in Arlington, Virginia, the company operates the CoStar online database and news website and several online marketplaces, including Apartments.com and Homes.com.

== History ==
=== Origins ===
CoStar Group was founded in 1987 by Andrew C. Florance in Washington, D.C., as one of the first companies that digitized and aggregated property data before the Internet became widely available. In 1998, the company went public via an initial public offering on Nasdaq, raising $22.5 million. In June 2004, the lawsuit CoStar Group, Inc. v. LoopNet, Inc. became a landmark case in copyright law about the role of an Internet service provider in monitoring copyrighted content posted on its servers. In October 2009, the company acquired a building from the Mortgage Bankers Association for $41.3 million, which served as the company's headquarters. The building had sold for $97 million two years earlier, with CoStar Group claiming that it had used its analytics data to determine the right time to buy. In 2025, CoStar Group moved its headquarters to Arlington, Virginia.

=== Growth and expansion ===
Throughout the 2010s, CoStar Group expanded its footprint in the commercial property industry with a series of acquisitions in North America and Europe. In 2009, it acquired Property and Portfolio Research company Grecam, joining the company's existing Grecam service. In 2012, it acquired the online marketing site LoopNet for $860 million. With the acquisition, CoStar Group also took over the Loopnet properties BizBuySell and LandsofAmerica. Two years later, the company acquired Apartments.com for $585 million, as well as Apartment Finder the following year.

From 2017 through 2020, the company acquired the online marketplaces Westside Rentals, ForRent.com (previously owned by Dominion Enterprises), Cozy Services, Off Campus Partners, and Ten-X; in addition to the hotel research and analytics firm STR, the residential mobile application provider Homesnap. In April 2021, it acquired Homes.com, a prominent residential real-estate website, from Dominion Enterprises for $156 million in cash. In February 2025, CoStar acquired the 3D spatial mapping company Matterport for $1.6 billion.

Overseas, its European division acquired the German real-estate business data company Thomas Daily and the Spanish online marketplace and information provider Belbex in 2016. From 2018 through 2023, it acquired the British online marketplace Realla, the German real-estate data company Emporis, the French online marketplace BureauxLocaux, and the British property portal OnTheMarket.

In April 2025, CoStar appointed former S&P Global Ratings president John Breisford, former Etsy CFO Rachel Glaser, and former Walt Disney Company CFO Christine McCarthy as independent directors. Louise Sams was appointed independent chair of the board.

After initially taking a 16.9% stake in Australian real estate information company Domain Group, CoStar entered an agreement to acquire 100% of the company for US$1.92 billion in May 2025.

In May 2026, CoStar Group agreed to acquire Zonda, a provider of new-home construction data and homebuilder software, from private equity firm MidOcean Partners for $800 million in cash. The deal gave CoStar Group Zonda's data and software for the residential homebuilding sector, along with its new-construction listing sites NewHomeSource.com and Livabl. The acquisition came amid antitrust scrutiny of CoStar's commercial real estate data business, including class-action lawsuits alleging it holds a dominant share of online commercial listings and has used that position to limit competition; CoStar has denied the allegations. The purchase was completed on August 21, 2026.

=== Other activities ===
In 2019, CoStar Group announced that Oxford Economics would provide the economic data and forecasts used in its products.

In 2022, Business Insider reported that over 29 then-current and former employees had claimed to have been excessively monitored and micromanaged – including with unscheduled check-in video calls made by the company's IT department – as well as being publicly berated and arbitrarily fired in some cases. The company made efforts to take down criticism of itself on various social media platforms. CoStar Group denied the allegations, contending that the discontent had stemmed from the company's high expectations.

In 2024, CoStar Group purchased an estimated $35 million worth of airtime at Super Bowl LVIII for four Super Bowl commercials advertising its subsidiaries Homes.com and Apartments.com, which The New York Times described as an effort to rival competitor services such as Zillow and Realtor.com.

CoStar has been criticized for anticompetitive and monopolistic business practices, often using aggressive litigation and "public-relations warfare" to "push [competitors] to the brink of collapse or weaken them enough to make them soft targets for an acquisition".

== Legal cases ==
=== Xceligent ===
In December 2016, CoStar Group filed a lawsuit against rival Xceligent, owned by London-based Daily Mail and General Trust for copyright infringement of thousands of images. According to the lawsuit, Xceligent used offshore contractors in India and the Philippines to copy CoStar Group's copyrighted photographs and crop out the CoStar Group watermark.. The court entered a $500 million judgement and permanent injunction against Xceligent, valuing each CoStar Group image at $50,000.

==== CREXi ====
In September 2020, CoStar Group filed a lawsuit against rival commercial real estate marketplace, Commercial Real Estate Exchange, Inc. (CREXi). The suit alleged CREXi engaged offshore contractors to copy and crop CoStar Group's copyrighted images from LoopNet, a CoStar Group website. In June 2025, the court found significant evidence that CREXi and its contractors copied images from LoopNet, and that CoStar Group owned the photographs that they claimed were infringed.

In September 2024, CoStar Group obtained a permanent injunction against CREXi's founding investor, Leon Capital LLC, for unauthorized access to CoStar's database.

Simultaneously, CoStar Group filed multiple lawsuits in India against CREXi-hired contractors, known as BPOs, for assisting in the copyright infringement. Those cases resulted in several judgments and permanent injunctions against CREXi's offshore contractors.

=== STR ===
In February 2024, a proposed consumer class action lawsuit was filed against CoStar Group in multiple states, accusing the company of a price-fixing conspiracy in which it conspired with a group of luxury hotel chains—including Hilton, Hyatt, Marriott, InterContinental, Loews, and Accor—to keep room rental prices artificially high by sharing competitively sensitive information through the company's STR reports. These allegations were based in part on insider information shared by an STR software engineer. In September 2025, the claims were dismissed by the court.

=== Move, Inc. ===
In July 2024, CoStar Group was sued by competitor Move, Inc., the operator of Realtor.com, for alleged trade secret misappropriation. Move sought a preliminary injunction against CoStar Group. The injunction was denied by a California federal court on the basis that Move had not provided evidence of any irreparable harm. In April 2025, less than a year after filing its lawsuit, Move voluntarily dismissed the case.

=== Zillow ===
CoStar Group sued Zillow in July 2025 for copyright infringement, including for using tens of thousands of CoStar Group's watermarked photographs on its sites, as well as syndicating those photographs on Zillow's partner sites, Redfin and Realtor.com.

== Business ==
CoStar Group provides commercial real estate information, analytics, and online marketplaces for real estate transactions. Its research services include online services and research for the rental home and hotel industry.

As of March 2026, its subsidiaries include:

- Apartments.com
- Belbex
- BizBuySell
- BureauxLocaux
- Business Immo
- CoStar
- Domain Group
- Emporis (dissolved)
- ForRent.com
- Grecam
- Homes.com
- Homesnap
- Land.com
- LoopNet
- Matterport
- Realla
- STR
- Ten-X
- Thomas Daily
- Visual Lease
