= CoStar Group, Inc. v. LoopNet, Inc. =

2004 U.S. appeals court case

- Court: United States Court of Appeals for the Fourth Circuit
- Full case name: CoStar Group, Inc. v. LoopNet, Inc.
- Argued: May 6 2004
- Decided: June 21 2004
- Citation: 373 F.3d 544

Holding
- Affirmed the decision of the district court, which found that the defendant was not liable for direct copyright infringement

Court membership
- Judges sitting: Paul V. Niemeyer, M. Blane Michael, and Roger Gregory

Case opinions
- Majority: Niemeyer, joined by Michael
- Dissent: Gregory

CoStar Group, Inc. v. LoopNet, Inc., 373 F.3d 544 (4th Cir. 2004), is a United States Court of Appeals for the Fourth Circuit decision about whether LoopNet should be held directly liable for CoStar Group’s copyrighted photographs posted by LoopNet’s subscribers on LoopNet’s website. The majority of the court ruled that since LoopNet was an Internet service provider ("ISP") that automatically and passively stored material at the direction of users, LoopNet did not copy the material in violation of the Copyright Act. The majority of the court also held that the screening process by a LoopNet employee before the images were stored and displayed did not alter the passivity of LoopNet. Judge Gregory dissented, stating that LoopNet had engaged in active, volitional conduct because of its screening process.

== Facts ==
CoStar Group is a provider of commercial real estate information. Its database included a large collection of photographs of commercial properties. LoopNet was an ISP whose website allowed subscribers to post listings of commercial real estate on the Internet. LoopNet did not post real estate listings, but enabled users to post listings that contained text messages and photographs. Prior to CoStar Group's original complaint about copyright infringement, when a photograph was uploaded into LoopNet's system by a subscriber, the photograph was made public immediately. Subsequent to CoStar Group's complaint, LoopNet initiated a system of review, which transferred uploads to one of LoopNet's internal computers for review. A LoopNet employee then reviewed the photograph to ensure that (1) it was an image of commercial real estate, and (2) it was not an obviously copyrighted image. CoStar Group claimed that by September 2001, it had found over 300 of its copyrighted images on LoopNet's website posted by LoopNet's subscribers. LoopNet had about 33,000 photographs posted by its subscribers at that time. LoopNet responded to takedown notices from CoStar Group.

== Issue ==
On appeal, the parties disputed whether LoopNet should be liable for direct copyright infringement.

== District court opinion ==
The district court held that LoopNet was not liable for direct copyright infringement based on Religious Technology Center v. Netcom. The Netcom case held that direct copyright infringement implied some element of volition or causation, which was lacking in automatic and passive ISPs. The district court held that LoopNet was such an automatic and passive ISP and therefore not liable for direct copyright infringement.

== Arguments of CoStar Group ==
CoStar Group argued that since the United States Congress considered the Religious Technology Center v. Netcom case and codified its principles in enacting the Digital Millennium Copyright Act ("DMCA"), the DMCA should supplant and preempt the Religious Technology Center v. Netcom case as the only exemption from liability for direct copyright infringement for ISPs. CoStar Group argued that because LoopNet could not satisfy the conditions of the DMCA, LoopNet should be strictly liable for direct copyright infringement.

CoStar also argued that even if Netcom's construction of copyright infringement liability for ISPs was still valid, LoopNet's acts were volitional and therefore LoopNet should be liable for direct copyright infringement because of its employee's screening process.

== Holdings of appellate court ==
The appellate court supported the Netcom decision as "a particularly rational interpretation of § 106 [of the Copyright Act]." The court reasoned that similar to a copying machine, an ISP who owned an electronic facility that responded automatically to users' input was not a direct infringer. The court also reasoned that temporary electronic copies made during the transmission were not "fixed" because such copies were used to automatically transmit users' material and they were not "of more than transitory duration."

In response to CoStar’s argument that the DMCA made the Netcom case irrelevant, the court held that the DMCA was not exclusive and that the Netcom case was still a valid precedent. The court first reasoned that the DMCA specifically provided that despite a failure to meet the safe-harbor conditions of § 512, an ISP was still entitled to all other arguments under the law. Second, the court reasoned that when Congress codified a common law principle, the common law remained good law. Third, the court reasoned that legislative history suggested that Congress intended the DMCA's safe harbor for ISPs to be a floor, not a ceiling, of protection.

As for CoStar Group's argument that the screening process by a LoopNet employee rendered LoopNet liable for direct copyright infringement, the court held that this conduct did not add volition to LoopNet's involvement in storing the copy. The court reasoned that the employee's look was so cursory as to be insignificant, and if it had any significance, it only lessened the possibility of copyright infringement. LoopNet still lacked the necessary volition or causation for direct copyright infringement.

== Dissenting Opinion by Judge Gregory ==
Circuit Judge Gregory dissented with the majority opinion. Judge Gregory stated that LoopNet employees had made conscious choices to accept or reject the photographs. Therefore, LoopNet had engaged in active, volitional conduct. Since the Netcom defense applied only to passive and automated ISPs, Judge Gregory concluded that the Netcom defense did not apply to LoopNet and the district court opinion should be reversed.

== See also ==
- Religious Technology Center v. Netcom On-Line Communication Services, Inc., 907 F. Supp. 1361 (N.D. Cal. 1995).
- Digital Millennium Copyright Act
- Online Copyright Infringement Liability Limitation Act
- List of leading legal cases in copyright law
