= Religious Technology Center v. Netcom On-Line Communication Services, Inc. =

1995 U.S. district court case

- Court: United States District Court for the Northern District of California
- Decided: Nov. 21, 1995
- Docket nos.: 95-cv-20091
- Citation: 907 F. Supp. 1361

Holding
- Internet access provider for a Bulletin Board System (BBS) operator not directly or vicariously liable for copyright infringement committed by subscriber to the BBS, where access provider took no affirmative action to copy work and received no direct financial benefit from the infringement. Disputed questions of fact regarding access provider's knowledge of infringement precluded summary judgment on contributory copyright infringement liability.

Court membership
- Judge sitting: Ronald M. Whyte

Keywords
- United States copyright law

Religious Technology Center v. Netcom On-Line Communication Services, Inc., 907 F. Supp. 1361 (N.D. Cal. 1995), is a U.S. district court case about whether the operator of a computer bulletin board service ("BBS") and Internet access provider that allows that BBS to reach the Internet should be liable for copyright infringement committed by a subscriber of the BBS. The plaintiff Religious Technology Center ("RTC") argued that defendant Netcom was directly, contributorily, and vicariously liable for copyright infringement. Netcom moved for summary judgment (i.e., Netcom urged the court to make a judgment without a full trial), disputing RTC's claims and raising a First Amendment argument and a fair use defense. The district court of the Northern District of California concluded that RTC's claims of direct and vicarious infringement failed, but genuine issues of fact precluded summary judgment on contributory liability and fair use. (I.e., facts about contributory liability and fair use that required adjudication by trial precluded the court from making a decision without a trial.)

== Facts ==
Plaintiff RTC held copyrights in the unpublished and published works of L. Ron Hubbard, the late founder of the Church of Scientology. Defendant Dennis Erlich was a vocal critic of the Church via the Usenet newsgroup alt.religion.scientology ("a.r.s."). Erlich posted portions of copyrighted works of RTC on a.r.s.

Erlich gained his access to the Internet through defendant Tom Klemesrud's bulletin board service ("BBS"), which had approximately 500 paying users. Klemesrud's BBS was linked to the Internet through the facilities of defendant Netcom. When Erlich posted messages to Usenet, he transmitted his messages to Klemesrud's computer using a telephone and a modem, and the messages were briefly stored on Klemesrud's computer. Then the messages were automatically copied from Klemesrud's computer to Netcom's computers and other computers on the Usenet according to a prearranged pattern. Once the messages were on Netcom's computers, they were available to Netcom's customers to download. The messages were stored on Netcom's system for eleven days and Klemesrud's system for three days.

RTC failed to persuade Erlich to stop his postings, and contacted Klemesrud and Netcom. Klemesrud asked RTC to prove that it owned the copyright to the works posted by Erlich, but RTC refused. Netcom similarly refused RTC's request that Erlich not be allowed to access the Internet through its system.

== Direct infringement ==
RTC alleged that Netcom was directly liable for making copies of its works. RTC also alleged that Netcom violated its exclusive rights to publicly display copies of its works. In the oral argument, RTC argued that Netcom violated its exclusive right to publicly distribute its works.

=== Creation of fixed copies ===
MAI Systems Corp. v. Peak Computer, Inc. established that the loading of data from a storage device into RAM constituted copying, because that data stayed in RAM long enough for it to be perceived. Erlich's act of sending a message to a.r.s. caused reproductions of portions of plaintiffs' work on both Klemesrud's and Netcom's storage devices, and these reproductions were sufficiently "fixed" to constitute recognizable copies under the Copyright Act.

=== Liability for making copies ===
The court refused to impose direct liability on Netcom for making copies. The court first reasoned that in contrast with the MAI case, Netcom did not take any affirmative action that could result in copying of RTC's work. The mere fact that Netcom's system incidentally made temporary copies of plaintiff's work did not mean Netcom had caused the copying. The court further stated that although copyright was a strict liability statute, some element of volition or causation was still required to constitute copyright infringement. Since such element was lacking, Netcom was not liable for direct infringement.

The court also considered the negative consequences of holding Netcom directly liable. If Netcom was liable for making autonomous and incidental copies, this would result in liability for every single Usenet server in the worldwide link of computers transmitting Erlich's message to every other computer. The court concluded that there was no need to construe the Copyright Act to make all of these parties infringers.

=== Public distribution and display ===
The court held that because the BBS merely stored and passed along all messages sent by its subscribers automatically and indiscriminately, the BBS should not be seen as causing these works to be publicly distributed or displayed. Similar to the creation of fixed copies, since there was no causation, Netcom should not be held liable for copyright infringement.

The court also found that there was no logical reason to hold Netcom uniquely responsible for distributing Erlich's messages. Since every Usenet server had a role in distributing RTC's works, holding Netcom liable would mean liability for all these Usenet servers.

=== Conclusion ===
The court held that it could not see any meaningful distinction between what Netcom did and what every other Usenet server did. Adopting a rule that held Netcom liable could lead to the liability of countless parties whose role in the infringement was nothing more than setting up and operating a system that was necessary for the functioning of the Internet.

== Contributory infringement ==
Contributory infringement can be established if the defendant has knowledge of the infringing activity and induces, causes or materially contributes to the infringing conduct of another.

=== Knowledge of infringing activity ===
The court held that if RTC could prove that Netcom had knowledge of the infringing activities, Netcom could be liable for contributory infringement since its failure to simply cancel Erlich's infringing message and thereby stop an infringing copy from being distributed could constitute substantial participation. However, there was a question of fact as to whether Netcom knew or should have known that such activities were infringing after receipt of RTC's letter. This genuine issue of fact precluded summary judgment on contributory liability. (I.e., the court could not make a decision on contributory liability without trial because of factual disputes.)

=== Substantial participation ===
The court held that Netcom did not completely relinquish control over how its system could be used. If Netcom could take simple measures to prevent further damage to RTC's copyrighted work, yet continued to aid in the accomplishment of Erlich's purpose of publicly distributing the postings, the participation of Netcom would be substantial.

== Vicarious liability ==
A defendant is liable for vicarious liability for the actions of a primary infringer if the defendant (1) has the right and ability to control the infringer's acts and (2) receives a direct financial benefit from the infringement.

=== Right and ability to control ===
RTC claimed that Netcom's terms of service specified that Netcom reserved the right to take remedial actions against subscribers. Netcom argued that it could not possibly screen messages before they were posted, and it had never exercised control over the content of users' postings. RTC disputed Netcom's claims. The court concluded that RTC raised a genuine issue of fact as to whether Netcom had the right and ability to exercise control over the activities of its subscribers. (I.e., the court could not make a decision on this issue without trial because of factual disputes.)

=== Direct financial benefit ===
The court held that Netcom did not receive direct financial benefit, because Netcom received only a fixed fee, and there was no evidence that infringement by Erlich in any way enhanced the value of Netcom's services to subscribers or attracted new subscribers. Since RTC failed to prove that Netcom received direct financial benefit from the infringing activity, RTC's claim of vicarious liability failed.

== First Amendment argument ==
Netcom argued that RTC's theory of liability contravened the First Amendment. The court held that imposing liability for copyright infringement where it was otherwise appropriate did not necessarily raise a First Amendment issue, since the copyright concepts of the idea/expression dichotomy and the fair use defense balanced the First Amendment and "promoting the progress of science and useful arts" clause of United States Constitution.

== Fair use defense ==
The court considered whether the actions of Netcom qualified as fair use. The Copyright Act has set out four nonexclusive factors.

=== Purpose and character of the use ===
The court held that although Netcom's use was to carry out its commercial function as an Internet access provider, the use benefited the public in allowing for the functioning of the Internet. The court also held that since financial incentive was unrelated to the infringing activity, the commercial nature of the use should not be dispositive. Furthermore, Netcom's use of copyrighted material served a completely different function than that of the plaintiffs. Therefore, this factor weighed in favor of fair use.

=== Nature of the copyrighted work ===
The works used were unpublished and creative. However, since Netcom's use of the works was merely to facilitate their posting to the Usenet, which was an entirely different purpose than plaintiff's use, the nature of the works was not important to the fair use determination.

=== Amount and substantiality of portion used ===
Citing Sony v. Universal, the court stated that the mere fact that all of a work was copied was not determinative of the fair use question. The court held that since Netcom copied no more than necessary to function as a Usenet server, this factor should not defeat an otherwise valid defense.

=== Effect of the use upon the potential market for or value of the copyrighted work ===
Netcom urged the court to focus on the "normal market" for the copyrighted work, which was through a Scientology-based organization. RTC responded that online distribution had the effect of market substitution. The court held that evidence raised a genuine issue of fact as to the possibility of market harm, which precluded summary judgment. (I.e., the court could not make a decision on this factor without trial because of factual disputes.)

== Conclusion ==
The court concluded that genuine issues of fact precluded summary judgment on contributory copyright infringement liability and Netcom's fair use defense (i.e., the court could not make a decision on contributory infringement and Netcom's fair use defense without trial because of factual disputes), and that RTC's claims of direct and vicarious infringement failed.

== Codification ==
According to H. Rept. 105-551, the case was codified in Online Copyright Infringement Liability Limitation Act as a portion of Digital Millennium Copyright Act ("DMCA"). The same report also refers to this case as "the leading and most thoughtful judicial decision to date" on this subject. CoStar Group, Inc. v. LoopNet, Inc., 373 F.3d 544 (4th Cir. 2004) held that the DMCA did not supplant or preempt the holdings of this case.

== See also ==
- Scientology versus the Internet
- Scientology and the legal system
- List of copyright case law
- CoStar Group, Inc. v. LoopNet, Inc., 373 F.3d 544 (4th Cir. 2004).
