= Netcom (United States) =

Defunct American Internet service provider

NETCOM On-Line Communication Services
- Company type: Public
- Industry: Internet service provider
- Founded: 1988; 38 years ago
- Founder: Bob Rieger
- Defunct: 1997
- Fate: Merged with ICG Communications
- Successor: ICG Communications; Mindspring
- Headquarters: San Jose

NETCOM On-Line Communication Services, Inc. was an Internet service provider headquartered in San Jose, California.

== Early history ==
Netcom was established in 1988 by Bob Rieger, an information systems engineer for Lockheed and Bill Gitow of System V. The company started off in San Jose, California as a service to allow local students to access university networks off-campus. The original accounts were all dialup shell accounts on Intel 80386 Tandy PCs running Xenix, with email addresses in the format of user@netcom.com. Netcom soon served 95% of the San Francisco Bay Area. They later expanded to serve other areas and replaced the Tandy PCs with equipment from Sun Microsystems.

When first launched, Rieger was the only system administrator for the company. Users would call him early in the morning to fix Internet access issues until he hired night staff. In 1992, the company was incorporated.

As the World Wide Web became more popular, and users were looking for an easy way to surf the Web, Netcom released a Windows 3.1 based program called NetCruiser (originally it was to be called Internet Xpress, but there were legal issues with calling it by that name, so it was changed in the latter part of development - although the email addresses were still kept user@ix.netcom.com). The NetCruiser service became very popular and made Netcom one of the leading Internet service providers by the mid-1990s. Netcom also had business T1, Frame Relay, UUCP, and dedicated dialup services.

In February 1995, Rieger turned the presidency of Netcom over to David W. Garrison, formerly of SkyTel. Under his direction, the company ventured into the business services market with web hosting and high-speed business connectivity products.

On September 30, 2000, the shell account services were discontinued.

== International growth ==
In December 1995, Netcom Canada, a subsidiary of Netcom On-line, was launched in Toronto, Ontario, with Ron Close as its CEO. Netcom Canada boasted a Canada-wide network, and allowed U.S. Netcom customers to access their Internet accounts via their network using either NetCruiser or any PPP dialer. It was the first Internet service provider in Canada to become EBITDA positive.

In May 1996, Netcom Internet Limited, a subsidiary in the United Kingdom, was launched. In 1997, Internetcom do Brasil SA was founded as a joint project between Netcom On-line and Itanet, a Brazilian telephone company.

In 1996 the company called itself the world's largest ISP, with some 500,000 subscribers.

== Acquisition and rebranding ==
On October 13 of 1997, ICG Communications announced in a press release that it had "entered into a definitive agreement and plan of merger with NETCOM On-Line Communication Services, Inc.". In February 1999, ICG sold off the Netcom's U.S. subscribers and other assets to MindSpring for $245 million in cash and stock. MindSpring later merged with EarthLink in 2000. Netcom Canada was bought by and was eventually merged with Metronet (the first Canadian CLEC), and AT&T Canada, with the combined entity acquiring the AT&T Canada name (later, in the summer of 2003, this entity dropped the AT&T name and rebranded itself as Allstream). Meanwhile, at the time of the MindSpring acquisition, Netcom Internet Limited in the United Kingdom became GTS Netcom, and in March 2003, it became part of the Viatel Group along with another business ISP, Cybernet.

On January 12, 2004, Netcom Internet Ltd was rebranded to Viatel Internet Limited.

== Controversies and issues ==
=== Kevin Mitnick ===
In February 1995, computer security researcher Tsutomu Shimomura monitored Netcom's network to track down an unknown attacker who electronically broke into his computer. While monitoring their network, he discovered the person who compromised his computer was Kevin Mitnick.

=== Scientology ===
Netcom became headline news when the Church of Scientology sued Netcom for copyright infringement. On February 13, 1995, armed police officers and attorneys from the Church of Scientology raided the home of Dennis Erlich, a former minister of the Church of Scientology. Erlich was charged with copyright infringement of the Scientology's Advanced Technology documents, and Netcom On-line was sued by the Church because a BBS owned by Tom Klemesrud hosted the alleged infringing material. This case became controversial among free speech advocates such as the EFF and Internet service providers since Netcom itself did not post the content nor have any involvement with it other than operating as a third-party hosting medium which did not actively monitor or censor their users' content. Netcom and Klemesrud eventually settled out of court.
