= Homes.com =

American real estate website

Homes.com, Inc.
- Company type: Subsidiary
- Industry: Real estate
- Founded: Tallahassee, Florida (January 28, 1999)
- Headquarters: 501 S. 5th Street; Richmond, Virginia 23219, United States
- Area served: United States & Canada
- Key people: David R. Mele (president); Guillen Antonio (vice president)
- Products: Agent IDX/VOW websites; Data services; Home values; Lead generation and management services; Mobile applications; Real estate search
- Number of employees: 400+
- Parent: CoStar Group
- Website: www.homes.com

Homes.com, Inc. is a real estate web portal that is owned and managed by CoStar Group. Headquartered at 501 S. 5th Street in Richmond, Virginia, Homes.com maintains additional offices in Boca Raton, Florida; Tallahassee, Florida; and San Diego, California. The company also provides real estate marketing and media services including brand advertising, property listing syndication, reputation management and lead generation.

== History ==
Homes.com began as the primary website for Homes and Land Publishing in 1993 and was incorporated in January 1999 as Homes.com, Inc. In March of the following year, a venture capital funding round generated $38.5 million and gave Hummer Winblad Venture Partners a controlling interest in Homes.com. In March 2000, shortly after its venture capital funding round, Homes.com acquired Web Society, Inc., doing business as Real Estate Village, for a combination of cash and stock. Real Estate Village, founded by John Perkins (CEO) and Grant Gould (VP of Sales) of San Diego, California, had over 100 employees and operated three offices at the time of the acquisition. The company became a subsidiary division of Homes.com, with Perkins and Gould continuing on as co-managing directors of the Real Estate Village operation for a brief transition period.

In March 2001, Homes.com filed for Chapter 11 bankruptcy protection as part of a financial restructuring following the dot-com market downturn. The filing came approximately one year after the company raised $38.5 million in venture capital funding during the peak of the dot-com bubble. Despite the bankruptcy, the company continued to operate its website and services during the reorganization process. As part of the turnaround effort, then-CEO Tom Orsi rehired John Perkins, co-founder of Real Estate Village—a company Homes.com had acquired the previous year—to assist in the restructuring and help guide the company through its exit from bankruptcy. Perkins remained with the company throughout the reorganization and continued in a leadership role until the company’s eventual sale to Trader Publishing Company. The reorganization enabled Homes.com to reduce operating costs and refocus its business model for long-term sustainability.

In October 2004, Homes.com, Inc. was purchased by Trader Publishing Company, a joint business venture of Landmark Media Enterprises and Cox Enterprises. In September 2006, Landmark Media Enterprises and Cox Enterprises split the assets of Trader Publishing and Homes.com, Inc. becoming a subsidiary of Dominion Enterprises, LLC.

In May 2011, Homes.com launched the Home Values channel to display automated estimates of home prices. In August, the company launched Homes Connect, a platform for real estate professionals. In September 2014, David Mele was appointed president of Homes.com. In January 2015, Andy Woolley became the head of industry development.

In April 2021, Landmark announced that Homes.com, a unit of its Dominion Enterprises subsidiary, had been sold to CoStar Group Inc. for $156 million.

== Products ==
- Homes.com real estate search enables perusal of a property's features, price, type and location.
- Data Services by Homes.com manages more than 650 MLS IDX (Internet Data Exchange) listing feeds representing over 4.3 million listings. The company provides IDX data aggregation and search technology to other real estate companies such as RE/MAX and ERA.
- Agent and Broker Websites can be purchased from Homes.com with IDX and VOW (Virtual Office Website) capabilities.
- Lead Generation and Management services aggregate leads from various sources and provide CRM tools for managing those leads.
